Lepidoptera of Greece consist of both the butterflies and moths recorded from Greece, including Crete, the Greek mainland and the Aegean Islands (including the Cyclades and Dodecanese).

Butterflies

Hesperiidae
Carcharodus alceae (Esper, 1780)
Carcharodus floccifera (Zeller, 1847)
Carcharodus lavatherae (Esper, 1783)
Carcharodus orientalis Reverdin, 1913
Carcharodus stauderi Reverdin, 1913
Carterocephalus palaemon (Pallas, 1771)
Erynnis marloyi (Boisduval, 1834)
Erynnis tages (Linnaeus, 1758)
Gegenes nostrodamus (Fabricius, 1793)
Gegenes pumilio (Hoffmannsegg, 1804)
Hesperia comma (Linnaeus, 1758)
Muschampia proto (Ochsenheimer, 1808)
Muschampia tessellum (Hübner, 1803)
Ochlodes sylvanus (Esper, 1777)
Pelopidas thrax (Hübner, 1821)
Pyrgus alveus (Hübner, 1803)
Pyrgus armoricanus (Oberthur, 1910)
Pyrgus carthami (Hübner, 1813)
Pyrgus cinarae (Rambur, 1839)
Pyrgus malvae (Linnaeus, 1758)
Pyrgus serratulae (Rambur, 1839)
Pyrgus sidae (Esper, 1784)
Spialia orbifer (Hübner, 1823)
Spialia phlomidis (Herrich-Schäffer, 1845)
Thymelicus acteon (Rottemburg, 1775)
Thymelicus hyrax (Lederer, 1861)
Thymelicus lineola (Ochsenheimer, 1808)
Thymelicus sylvestris (Poda, 1761)

Lycaenidae
Agriades dardanus (Freyer, 1844)
Aricia agestis (Denis & Schiffermüller, 1775)
Aricia anteros (Freyer, 1838)
Aricia artaxerxes (Fabricius, 1793)
Callophrys rubi (Linnaeus, 1758)
Celastrina argiolus (Linnaeus, 1758)
Cupido minimus (Fuessly, 1775)
Cupido osiris (Meigen, 1829)
Cupido alcetas (Hoffmannsegg, 1804)
Cupido argiades (Pallas, 1771)
Cupido decolorata (Staudinger, 1886)
Cyaniris semiargus (Rottemburg, 1775)
Eumedonia eumedon (Esper, 1780)
Favonius quercus (Linnaeus, 1758)
Freyeria trochylus (Freyer, 1845)
Glaucopsyche alexis (Poda, 1761)
Iolana iolas (Ochsenheimer, 1816)
Kretania eurypilus (Freyer, 1851)
Kretania psylorita (Freyer, 1845)
Kretania sephirus (Frivaldzky, 1835)
Lampides boeticus (Linnaeus, 1767)
Leptotes pirithous (Linnaeus, 1767)
Lycaena alciphron (Rottemburg, 1775)
Lycaena candens (Herrich-Schäffer, 1844)
Lycaena dispar (Haworth, 1802)
Lycaena ottomanus (Lefebvre, 1830)
Lycaena phlaeas (Linnaeus, 1761)
Lycaena thersamon (Esper, 1784)
Lycaena thetis Klug, 1834
Lycaena tityrus (Poda, 1761)
Lycaena virgaureae (Linnaeus, 1758)
Lysandra bellargus (Rottemburg, 1775)
Lysandra coridon (Poda, 1761)
Neolysandra coelestina (Eversmann, 1843)
Phengaris alcon (Denis & Schiffermüller, 1775)
Phengaris arion (Linnaeus, 1758)
Plebejidea loewii (Zeller, 1847)
Plebejus argus (Linnaeus, 1758)
Plebejus argyrognomon (Bergstrasser, 1779)
Plebejus idas (Linnaeus, 1761)
Polyommatus admetus (Esper, 1783)
Polyommatus andronicus Coutsis & Gavalas, 1995
Polyommatus aroaniensis (Brown, 1976)
Polyommatus damon (Denis & Schiffermüller, 1775)
Polyommatus iphigenia (Herrich-Schäffer, 1847)
Polyommatus nephohiptamenos (Brown & Coutsis, 1978)
Polyommatus orphicus Kolev, 2005
Polyommatus ripartii (Freyer, 1830)
Polyommatus daphnis (Denis & Schiffermüller, 1775)
Polyommatus amandus (Schneider, 1792)
Polyommatus dorylas (Denis & Schiffermüller, 1775)
Polyommatus eros (Ochsenheimer, 1808)
Polyommatus escheri (Hübner, 1823)
Polyommatus icarus (Rottemburg, 1775)
Polyommatus thersites (Cantener, 1835)
Polyommatus timfristos Lukhtanov, Vishnevskaya & Shapoval, 2016 
Pseudophilotes bavius (Eversmann, 1832)
Pseudophilotes vicrama (Moore, 1865)
Satyrium acaciae (Fabricius, 1787)
Satyrium ilicis (Esper, 1779)
Satyrium ledereri (Boisduval, 1848)
Satyrium pruni (Linnaeus, 1758)
Satyrium spini (Denis & Schiffermüller, 1775)
Satyrium w-album (Knoch, 1782)
Scolitantides orion (Pallas, 1771)
Tarucus balkanica (Freyer, 1844)
Thecla betulae (Linnaeus, 1758)
Turanana panagea (Herrich-Schäffer, 1851)
Turanana taygetica (Rebel, 1902)
Zizeeria karsandra (Moore, 1865)

Riodinidae
Hamearis lucina (Linnaeus, 1758)

Nymphalidae
Aglais io (Linnaeus, 1758)
Aglais urticae (Linnaeus, 1758)
Apatura ilia (Denis & Schiffermüller, 1775)
Apatura iris (Linnaeus, 1758)
Apatura metis Freyer, 1829
Aphantopus hyperantus (Linnaeus, 1758)
Araschnia levana (Linnaeus, 1758)
Arethusana arethusa (Denis & Schiffermüller, 1775)
Argynnis paphia (Linnaeus, 1758)
Argynnis pandora (Denis & Schiffermüller, 1775)
Boloria graeca (Staudinger, 1870)
Boloria dia (Linnaeus, 1767)
Boloria euphrosyne (Linnaeus, 1758)
Brenthis daphne (Bergstrasser, 1780)
Brenthis hecate (Denis & Schiffermüller, 1775)
Brintesia circe (Fabricius, 1775)
Charaxes jasius (Linnaeus, 1767)
Chazara briseis (Linnaeus, 1764)
Coenonympha arcania (Linnaeus, 1761)
Coenonympha glycerion (Borkhausen, 1788)
Coenonympha leander (Esper, 1784)
Coenonympha orientalis Rebel, 1910
Coenonympha pamphilus (Linnaeus, 1758)
Coenonympha rhodopensis Elwes, 1900
Coenonympha thyrsis (Freyer, 1845)
Danaus chrysippus (Linnaeus, 1758)
Erebia aethiops (Esper, 1777)
Erebia cassioides (Reiner & Hochenwarth, 1792)
Erebia epiphron (Knoch, 1783)
Erebia euryale (Esper, 1805)
Erebia ligea (Linnaeus, 1758)
Erebia medusa (Denis & Schiffermüller, 1775)
Erebia melas (Herbst, 1796)
Erebia oeme (Hübner, 1804)
Erebia ottomana Herrich-Schäffer, 1847
Erebia rhodopensis Nicholl, 1900
Fabriciana adippe (Denis & Schiffermüller, 1775)
Fabriciana niobe (Linnaeus, 1758)
Euphydryas aurinia (Rottemburg, 1775)
Hipparchia fagi (Scopoli, 1763)
Hipparchia syriaca (Staudinger, 1871)
Hipparchia fatua Freyer, 1844
Hipparchia statilinus (Hufnagel, 1766)
Hipparchia christenseni Kudrna, 1977
Hipparchia cretica (Rebel, 1916)
Hipparchia mersina (Staudinger, 1871)
Hipparchia pellucida (Stauder, 1923)
Hipparchia senthes (Fruhstorfer, 1908)
Hipparchia volgensis (Mazochin-Porshnjakov, 1952)
Hyponephele lupinus (O. Costa, 1836)
Hyponephele lycaon (Rottemburg, 1775)
Issoria lathonia (Linnaeus, 1758)
Kirinia climene (Esper, 1783)
Kirinia roxelana (Cramer, 1777)
Lasiommata maera (Linnaeus, 1758)
Lasiommata megera (Linnaeus, 1767)
Lasiommata petropolitana (Fabricius, 1787)
Libythea celtis (Laicharting, 1782)
Limenitis camilla (Linnaeus, 1764)
Limenitis populi (Linnaeus, 1758)
Limenitis reducta Staudinger, 1901
Maniola chia Thomson, 1987
Maniola halicarnassus Thomson, 1990
Maniola jurtina (Linnaeus, 1758)
Maniola megala (Oberthur, 1909)
Maniola telmessia (Zeller, 1847)
Melanargia galathea (Linnaeus, 1758)
Melanargia larissa (Geyer, 1828)
Melanargia russiae (Esper, 1783)
Melitaea arduinna (Esper, 1783)
Melitaea athalia (Rottemburg, 1775)
Melitaea aurelia Nickerl, 1850
Melitaea cinxia (Linnaeus, 1758)
Melitaea didyma (Esper, 1778)
Melitaea phoebe (Denis & Schiffermüller, 1775)
Melitaea trivia (Denis & Schiffermüller, 1775)
Minois dryas (Scopoli, 1763)
Neptis rivularis (Scopoli, 1763)
Neptis sappho (Pallas, 1771)
Nymphalis antiopa (Linnaeus, 1758)
Nymphalis polychloros (Linnaeus, 1758)
Nymphalis xanthomelas (Esper, 1781)
Pararge aegeria (Linnaeus, 1758)
Polygonia c-album (Linnaeus, 1758)
Polygonia egea (Cramer, 1775)
Proterebia afra (Fabricius, 1787)
Pseudochazara amymone Brown, 1976
Pseudochazara anthelea (Hübner, 1824)
Pseudochazara cingovskii Gross, 1973
Pseudochazara geyeri (Herrich-Schäffer, 1846)
Pseudochazara graeca (Staudinger, 1870)
Pseudochazara orestes De Prins & van der Poorten, 1981
Pyronia cecilia (Vallantin, 1894)
Pyronia tithonus (Linnaeus, 1767)
Satyrus ferula (Fabricius, 1793)
Speyeria aglaja (Linnaeus, 1758)
Vanessa atalanta (Linnaeus, 1758)
Vanessa cardui (Linnaeus, 1758)
Ypthima asterope (Klug, 1832)

Papilionidae
Archon apollinus (Herbst, 1798)
Iphiclides podalirius (Linnaeus, 1758)
Papilio alexanor Esper, 1800
Papilio machaon Linnaeus, 1758
Parnassius apollo (Linnaeus, 1758)
Parnassius mnemosyne (Linnaeus, 1758)
Zerynthia cerisy (Godart, 1824)
Zerynthia cretica (Rebel, 1904)
Zerynthia polyxena (Denis & Schiffermüller, 1775)

Pieridae
Anthocharis cardamines (Linnaeus, 1758)
Anthocharis damone Boisduval, 1836
Anthocharis gruneri Herrich-Schäffer, 1851
Aporia crataegi (Linnaeus, 1758)
Colias alfacariensis Ribbe, 1905
Colias aurorina Herrich-Schäffer, 1850
Colias caucasica Staudinger, 1871
Colias croceus (Fourcroy, 1785)
Colias erate (Esper, 1805)
Euchloe penia (Freyer, 1851)
Euchloe ausonia (Hübner, 1804)
Gonepteryx cleopatra (Linnaeus, 1767)
Gonepteryx farinosa (Zeller, 1847)
Gonepteryx rhamni (Linnaeus, 1758)
Leptidea duponcheli (Staudinger, 1871)
Leptidea sinapis (Linnaeus, 1758)
Pieris balcana Lorkovic, 1970
Pieris brassicae (Linnaeus, 1758)
Pieris ergane (Geyer, 1828)
Pieris krueperi Staudinger, 1860
Pieris mannii (Mayer, 1851)
Pieris napi (Linnaeus, 1758)
Pieris rapae (Linnaeus, 1758)
Pontia chloridice (Hübner, 1813)
Pontia edusa (Fabricius, 1777)

Moths

Adelidae
Adela croesella (Scopoli, 1763)
Adela mazzolella (Hübner, 1801)
Adela paludicolella Zeller, 1850
Adela repetitella Mann, 1861
Cauchas anatolica (Rebel, 1902)
Cauchas leucocerella (Scopoli, 1763)
Cauchas rufifrontella (Treitschke, 1833)
Nematopogon pilella (Denis & Schiffermüller, 1775)
Nematopogon robertella (Clerck, 1759)
Nemophora barbatellus (Zeller, 1847)
Nemophora dumerilella (Duponchel, 1839)
Nemophora fasciella (Fabricius, 1775)
Nemophora metallica (Poda, 1761)
Nemophora minimella (Denis & Schiffermüller, 1775)
Nemophora raddaella (Hübner, 1793)

Alucitidae
Alucita hexadactyla Linnaeus, 1758
Alucita huebneri Wallengren, 1859
Alucita major (Rebel, 1906)
Alucita palodactyla Zeller, 1847
Alucita pectinata Scholz & Jackh, 1994
Alucita zonodactyla Zeller, 1847

Argyresthiidae
Argyresthia glaucinella Zeller, 1839
Argyresthia hilfiella Rebel, 1910
Argyresthia pruniella (Clerck, 1759)
Argyresthia spinosella Stainton, 1849

Autostichidae
Amselina cedestiella (Zeller, 1868)
Amselina emir (Gozmány, 1961)
Amselina kasyi (Gozmány, 1961)
Amselina virgo (Gozmány, 1959)
Apatema apolausticum Gozmány, 1996
Apatema mediopallidum Walsingham, 1900
Apatema sutteri Gozmány, 1997
Apatema whalleyi (Popescu-Gorj & Capuse, 1965)
Aprominta aga Gozmány, 1962
Aprominta aperitta Gozmány, 1997
Aprominta argonauta Gozmány, 1964
Aprominta atricanella (Rebel, 1906)
Aprominta bifasciata (Staudinger, 1870)
Aprominta designatella (Herrich-Schäffer, 1855)
Aprominta gloriosa Gozmány, 1959
Aprominta pannosella (Rebel, 1906)
Aprominta reisseri Gozmány, 1959
Aprominta separata Gozmány, 1961
Aprominta tectaphella (Rebel, 1916)
Aprominta xena Gozmány, 1959
Charadraula cassandra Gozmány, 1967
Deroxena venosulella (Moschler, 1862)
Dysspastus baldizzonei Gozmány, 1977
Dysspastus ios Gozmány, 2000
Dysspastus musculina (Staudinger, 1870)
Dysspastus undecimpunctella (Mann, 1864)
Holcopogon bubulcellus (Staudinger, 1859)
Nukusa cinerella (Rebel, 1941)
Oecia oecophila (Staudinger, 1876)
Oegoconia ariadne Gozmány, 1988
Oegoconia caradjai Popescu-Gorj & Capuse, 1965
Oegoconia deauratella (Herrich-Schäffer, 1854)
Oegoconia novimundi (Busck, 1915)
Oegoconia uralskella Popescu-Gorj & Capuse, 1965
Pantacordis pantsa (Gozmány, 1963)
Pantacordis scotinella (Rebel, 1916)
Symmoca attalica Gozmány, 1957
Symmoca christenseni Gozmány, 1982
Symmoca signatella Herrich-Schäffer, 1854
Symmoca signella (Hübner, 1796)
Symmoca sutteri Gozmány, 2000
Symmoca vitiosella Zeller, 1868
Syringopais temperatella (Lederer, 1855)

Batrachedridae
Batrachedra parvulipunctella Chrétien, 1915

Bedelliidae
Bedellia somnulentella (Zeller, 1847)

Blastobasidae
Blastobasis phycidella (Zeller, 1839)
Tecmerium perplexum (Gozmány, 1957)

Brachodidae
Brachodes beryti (Stainton, 1867)
Brachodes compar (Staudinger, 1879)
Brachodes nana (Treitschke, 1834)
Brachodes pumila (Ochsenheimer, 1808)
Brachodes tristis (Staudinger, 1879)

Brahmaeidae
Lemonia balcanica (Herrich-Schäffer, 1847)
Lemonia dumi (Linnaeus, 1761)
Lemonia taraxaci (Denis & Schiffermüller, 1775)

Bucculatricidae
Bucculatrix albedinella (Zeller, 1839)
Bucculatrix albella Stainton, 1867
Bucculatrix cretica Deschka, 1991
Bucculatrix infans Staudinger, 1880
Bucculatrix phagnalella Walsingham, 1908
Bucculatrix ulmella Zeller, 1848

Carposinidae
Carposina scirrhosella Herrich-Schäffer, 1854

Choreutidae
Anthophila fabriciana (Linnaeus, 1767)
Choreutis nemorana (Hübner, 1799)
Choreutis pariana (Clerck, 1759)
Prochoreutis myllerana (Fabricius, 1794)
Prochoreutis stellaris (Zeller, 1847)
Tebenna micalis (Mann, 1857)
Tebenna pretiosana (Duponchel, 1842)

Cimeliidae
Axia nesiota Reisser, 1962

Coleophoridae
Augasma aeratella (Zeller, 1839)
Coleophora achilleae Baldizzone, 2001
Coleophora acrisella Milliere, 1872
Coleophora adjectella Hering, 1937
Coleophora adspersella Benander, 1939
Coleophora aestuariella Bradley, 1984
Coleophora afrosarda Baldizzone & Kaltenbach, 1983
Coleophora alashiae Baldizzone, 1996
Coleophora albella (Thunberg, 1788)
Coleophora albicostella (Duponchel, 1842)
Coleophora albidella (Denis & Schiffermüller, 1775)
Coleophora albilineella Toll, 1960
Coleophora alcyonipennella (Kollar, 1832)
Coleophora aleramica Baldizzone & Stubner, 2007
Coleophora alticolella Zeller, 1849
Coleophora amethystinella Ragonot, 1855
Coleophora anatipenella (Hübner, 1796)
Coleophora asteris Muhlig, 1864
Coleophora badiipennella (Duponchel, 1843)
Coleophora ballotella (Fischer v. Röslerstamm, 1839)
Coleophora basimaculella Mann, 1864
Coleophora bilineatella Zeller, 1849
Coleophora bilineella Herrich-Schäffer, 1855
Coleophora breviuscula Staudinger, 1880
Coleophora calycotomella Stainton, 1869
Coleophora chamaedriella Bruand, 1852
Coleophora christenseni Baldizzone, 1983
Coleophora cnossiaca Baldizzone, 1983
Coleophora coarctataephaga Toll, 1961
Coleophora colutella (Fabricius, 1794)
Coleophora congeriella Staudinger, 1859
Coleophora conspicuella Zeller, 1849
Coleophora conyzae Zeller, 1868
Coleophora corsicella Walsingham, 1898
Coleophora coxi Baldizzone & van der Wolf, 2007
Coleophora crepidinella Zeller, 1847
Coleophora cuprariella Lienig & Zeller, 1864
Coleophora currucipennella Zeller, 1839
Coleophora deauratella Lienig & Zeller, 1846
Coleophora dentiferella Toll, 1952
Coleophora depunctella Toll, 1961
Coleophora deviella Zeller, 1847
Coleophora dianthi Herrich-Schäffer, 1855
Coleophora dignella Toll, 1961
Coleophora discordella Zeller, 1849
Coleophora drymidis Mann, 1857
Coleophora epijudaica Amsel, 1935
Coleophora eupepla Gozmány, 1954
Coleophora filaginella Fuchs, 1881
Coleophora flaviella Mann, 1857
Coleophora follicularis (Vallot, 1802)
Coleophora fretella Zeller, 1847
Coleophora frischella (Linnaeus, 1758)
Coleophora galbulipennella Zeller, 1838
Coleophora genistae Stainton, 1857
Coleophora graeca Baldizzone, 1990
Coleophora granulatella Zeller, 1849
Coleophora halophilella Zimmermann, 1926
Coleophora hartigi Toll, 1944
Coleophora helianthemella Milliere, 1870
Coleophora helichrysiella Krone, 1909
Coleophora hemerobiella (Scopoli, 1763)
Coleophora hospitiella Chrétien, 1915
Coleophora ibipennella Zeller, 1849
Coleophora jerusalemella Toll, 1942
Coleophora juncicolella Stainton, 1851
Coleophora kautzi Rebel, 1933
Coleophora klimeschiella Toll, 1952
Coleophora kroneella Fuchs, 1899
Coleophora laconiae Baldizzone, 1983
Coleophora lassella Staudinger, 1859
Coleophora lebedella Falkovitsh, 1982
Coleophora limosipennella (Duponchel, 1843)
Coleophora lineolea (Haworth, 1828)
Coleophora longicornella Constant, 1893
Coleophora luteolella Staudinger, 1880
Coleophora lutipennella (Zeller, 1838)
Coleophora maritimella Newman, 1863
Coleophora mausolella Chrétien, 1908
Coleophora mayrella (Hübner, 1813)
Coleophora medelichensis Krone, 1908
Coleophora meridionella Rebel, 1912
Coleophora minoica Baldizzone, 1983
Coleophora nesiotidella Baldizzone & v.d. Wolf, 2000
Coleophora nigridorsella Amsel, 1935
Coleophora nikiella Baldizzone, 1983
Coleophora niveicostella Zeller, 1839
Coleophora nutantella Muhlig & Frey, 1857
Coleophora obtectella Zeller, 1849
Coleophora ochrea (Haworth, 1828)
Coleophora ochripennella Zeller, 1849
Coleophora ochroflava Toll, 1961
Coleophora olympica Baldizzone, 1983
Coleophora onobrychiella Zeller, 1849
Coleophora ononidella Milliere, 1879
Coleophora onopordiella Zeller, 1849
Coleophora oriolella Zeller, 1849
Coleophora ornatipennella (Hübner, 1796)
Coleophora paramayrella Nel, 1993
Coleophora parthenica Meyrick, 1891
Coleophora parvicuprella Baldizzone & Tabell, 2006
Coleophora patzaki Baldizzone, 1983
Coleophora pennella (Denis & Schiffermüller, 1775)
Coleophora peribenanderi Toll, 1943
Coleophora pseudodianthi Baldizzone & Tabell, 2006
Coleophora pyrrhulipennella Zeller, 1839
Coleophora quadristraminella Toll, 1961
Coleophora qulikushella Toll, 1959
Coleophora salicorniae Heinemann & Wocke, 1877
Coleophora saxicolella (Duponchel, 1843)
Coleophora semicinerea Staudinger, 1859
Coleophora serinipennella Christoph, 1872
Coleophora serpylletorum Hering, 1889
Coleophora serratulella Herrich-Schäffer, 1855
Coleophora soffneriella Toll, 1961
Coleophora spartana Baldizzone, 2010
Coleophora stramentella Zeller, 1849
Coleophora taeniipennella Herrich-Schäffer, 1855
Coleophora tamesis Waters, 1929
Coleophora taurica Baldizzone, 1994
Coleophora tauricella Staudinger, 1880
Coleophora taygeti Baldizzone, 1983
Coleophora therinella Tengstrom, 1848
Coleophora thymi Hering, 1942
Coleophora tricolor Walsingham, 1889
Coleophora trifolii (Curtis, 1832)
Coleophora tyrrhaenica Amsel, 1951
Coleophora valesianella Zeller, 1849
Coleophora variicornis Toll, 1952
Coleophora versurella Zeller, 1849
Coleophora vicinella Zeller, 1849
Coleophora virgatella Zeller, 1849
Coleophora zelleriella Heinemann, 1854
Goniodoma auroguttella (Fischer v. Röslerstamm, 1841)
Goniodoma limoniella (Stainton, 1884)
Goniodoma nemesi Capuse, 1970

Cosmopterigidae
Alloclita recisella Staudinger, 1859
Anatrachyntis badia (Hodges, 1962)
Ascalenia vanella (Frey, 1860)
Coccidiphila gerasimovi Danilevsky, 1950
Cosmopterix athesiae Huemer & Koster, 2006
Cosmopterix coryphaea Walsingham, 1908
Cosmopterix crassicervicella Chrétien, 1896
Cosmopterix lienigiella Zeller, 1846
Cosmopterix pararufella Riedl, 1976
Cosmopterix pulchrimella Chambers, 1875
Eteobalea albiapicella (Duponchel, 1843)
Eteobalea anonymella (Riedl, 1965)
Eteobalea dohrnii (Zeller, 1847)
Eteobalea intermediella (Riedl, 1966)
Eteobalea isabellella (O. G. Costa, 1836)
Eteobalea serratella (Treitschke, 1833)
Eteobalea sumptuosella (Lederer, 1855)
Hodgesiella rebeli (Krone, 1905)
Limnaecia phragmitella Stainton, 1851
Pancalia leuwenhoekella (Linnaeus, 1761)
Pancalia nodosella (Bruand, 1851)
Pancalia schwarzella (Fabricius, 1798)
Pyroderces argyrogrammos (Zeller, 1847)
Pyroderces caesaris Gozmány, 1957
Ramphis libanoticus Riedl, 1969
Sorhagenia lophyrella (Douglas, 1846)
Sorhagenia reconditella Riedl, 1983
Vulcaniella cognatella Riedl, 1990
Vulcaniella grabowiella (Staudinger, 1859)
Vulcaniella grandiferella Sinev, 1986
Vulcaniella klimeschi (Riedl, 1966)
Vulcaniella pomposella (Zeller, 1839)
Vulcaniella rosmarinella (Walsingham, 1891)

Cossidae
Acossus terebra (Denis & Schiffermüller, 1775)
Cossus cossus (Linnaeus, 1758)
Danielostygia persephone Reisser, 1962
Dyspessa aphrodite Yakovlev & Witt, 2007
Dyspessa salicicola (Eversmann, 1848)
Dyspessa ulula (Borkhausen, 1790)
Parahypopta caestrum (Hübner, 1808)
Paropta paradoxus (Herrich-Schäffer, 1851)
Phragmacossia albida (Erschoff, 1874)
Phragmacossia minos Reisser, 1962
Phragmataecia castaneae (Hübner, 1790)
Stygia mosulensis Daniel, 1965
Stygoides colchica (Herrich-Schäffer, 1851)
Zeuzera pyrina (Linnaeus, 1761)

Crambidae
Achyra nudalis (Hübner, 1796)
Aeschremon disparalis (Herrich-Schäffer, 1851)
Agriphila beieri Błeszyński, 1953
Agriphila brioniellus (Zerny, 1914)
Agriphila cyrenaicellus (Ragonot, 1887)
Agriphila dalmatinellus (Hampson, 1900)
Agriphila geniculea (Haworth, 1811)
Agriphila indivisellus (Turati & Zanon, 1922)
Agriphila inquinatella (Denis & Schiffermüller, 1775)
Agriphila latistria (Haworth, 1811)
Agriphila paleatellus (Zeller, 1847)
Agriphila selasella (Hübner, 1813)
Agriphila tersellus (Lederer, 1855)
Agriphila tolli (Błeszyński, 1952)
Agriphila trabeatellus (Herrich-Schäffer, 1848)
Agriphila tristella (Denis & Schiffermüller, 1775)
Agrotera nemoralis (Scopoli, 1763)
Anania coronata (Hufnagel, 1767)
Anania crocealis (Hübner, 1796)
Anania funebris (Strom, 1768)
Anania hortulata (Linnaeus, 1758)
Anania lancealis (Denis & Schiffermüller, 1775)
Anania stachydalis (Germar, 1821)
Anania testacealis (Zeller, 1847)
Anania verbascalis (Denis & Schiffermüller, 1775)
Anarpia incertalis (Duponchel, 1832)
Ancylolomia disparalis Hübner, 1825
Ancylolomia palpella (Denis & Schiffermüller, 1775)
Ancylolomia pectinatellus (Zeller, 1847)
Ancylolomia tentaculella (Hübner, 1796)
Angustalius malacellus (Duponchel, 1836)
Anthophilopsis baphialis (Staudinger, 1871)
Antigastra catalaunalis (Duponchel, 1833)
Aporodes floralis (Hübner, 1809)
Calamotropha aureliellus (Fischer v. Röslerstamm, 1841)
Calamotropha hackeri Ganev, 1985
Calamotropha hierichuntica Zeller, 1867
Calamotropha paludella (Hübner, 1824)
Cataclysta lemnata (Linnaeus, 1758)
Cataonia erubescens (Christoph, 1877)
Catoptria acutangulellus (Herrich-Schäffer, 1847)
Catoptria casalei Bassi, 1999
Catoptria confusellus (Staudinger, 1882)
Catoptria dimorphellus (Staudinger, 1882)
Catoptria falsella (Denis & Schiffermüller, 1775)
Catoptria fibigeri Ganev, 1987
Catoptria fulgidella (Hübner, 1813)
Catoptria gozmanyi Błeszyński, 1956
Catoptria languidellus (Zeller, 1863)
Catoptria margaritella (Denis & Schiffermüller, 1775)
Catoptria myella (Hübner, 1796)
Catoptria mytilella (Hübner, 1805)
Catoptria olympica Ganev, 1983
Catoptria pinella (Linnaeus, 1758)
Chilo luteellus (Motschulsky, 1866)
Cholius luteolaris (Scopoli, 1772)
Chrysocrambus craterella (Scopoli, 1763)
Chrysocrambus linetella (Fabricius, 1781)
Chrysoteuchia culmella (Linnaeus, 1758)
Cornifrons ulceratalis Lederer, 1858
Crambus lathoniellus (Zincken, 1817)
Crambus pascuella (Linnaeus, 1758)
Crambus perlella (Scopoli, 1763)
Crambus pratella (Linnaeus, 1758)
Crambus uliginosellus Zeller, 1850
Cybalomia pentadalis (Lederer, 1855)
Cynaeda dentalis (Denis & Schiffermüller, 1775)
Cynaeda gigantea (Wocke, 1871)
Dentifovea fulvifascialis (Christoph, 1887)
Diasemia reticularis (Linnaeus, 1761)
Diasemiopsis ramburialis (Duponchel, 1834)
Dolicharthria bruguieralis (Duponchel, 1833)
Dolicharthria metasialis (Rebel, 1916)
Dolicharthria punctalis (Denis & Schiffermüller, 1775)
Dolicharthria stigmosalis (Herrich-Schäffer, 1848)
Donacaula forficella (Thunberg, 1794)
Donacaula mucronella (Denis & Schiffermüller, 1775)
Donacaula niloticus (Zeller, 1867)
Duponchelia fovealis Zeller, 1847
Ecpyrrhorrhoe diffusalis (Guenée, 1854)
Ecpyrrhorrhoe rubiginalis (Hübner, 1796)
Elophila nymphaeata (Linnaeus, 1758)
Elophila rivulalis (Duponchel, 1834)
Epascestria pustulalis (Hübner, 1823)
Ephelis cruentalis (Geyer, 1832)
Euchromius bella (Hübner, 1796)
Euchromius bleszynskiellus Popescu-Gorj, 1964
Euchromius ocellea (Haworth, 1811)
Euchromius rayatellus (Amsel, 1949)
Euchromius superbellus (Zeller, 1849)
Euchromius vinculellus (Zeller, 1847)
Euclasta splendidalis (Herrich-Schäffer, 1848)
Eudonia angustea (Curtis, 1827)
Eudonia delunella (Stainton, 1849)
Eudonia lacustrata (Panzer, 1804)
Eudonia laetella (Zeller, 1846)
Eudonia mercurella (Linnaeus, 1758)
Eudonia murana (Curtis, 1827)
Eudonia phaeoleuca (Zeller, 1846)
Eudonia speideli Leraut, 1982
Eurrhypis cacuminalis (Eversmann, 1843)
Eurrhypis guttulalis (Herrich-Schäffer, 1848)
Eurrhypis pollinalis (Denis & Schiffermüller, 1775)
Evergestis aenealis (Denis & Schiffermüller, 1775)
Evergestis caesialis (Herrich-Schäffer, 1849)
Evergestis desertalis (Hübner, 1813)
Evergestis extimalis (Scopoli, 1763)
Evergestis frumentalis (Linnaeus, 1761)
Evergestis infirmalis (Staudinger, 1871)
Evergestis isatidalis (Duponchel, 1833)
Evergestis limbata (Linnaeus, 1767)
Evergestis mundalis (Guenée, 1854)
Evergestis nomadalis (Lederer, 1871)
Evergestis serratalis (Staudinger, 1871)
Evergestis sophialis (Fabricius, 1787)
Evergestis subfuscalis (Staudinger, 1871)
Glaucocharis euchromiella (Ragonot, 1895)
Heliothela wulfeniana (Scopoli, 1763)
Hellula undalis (Fabricius, 1781)
Hodebertia testalis (Fabricius, 1794)
Hydriris ornatalis (Duponchel, 1832)
Hyperlais argillacealis (Zeller, 1847)
Hyperlais dulcinalis (Treitschke, 1835)
Hyperlais nemausalis (Duponchel, 1834)
Loxostege aeruginalis (Hübner, 1796)
Loxostege deliblatica Szent-Ivany & Uhrik-Meszaros, 1942
Loxostege manualis (Geyer, 1832)
Loxostege sticticalis (Linnaeus, 1761)
Loxostege turbidalis (Treitschke, 1829)
Mecyna asinalis (Hübner, 1819)
Mecyna flavalis (Denis & Schiffermüller, 1775)
Mecyna lutealis (Duponchel, 1833)
Mecyna subsequalis (Herrich-Schäffer, 1851)
Mecyna trinalis (Denis & Schiffermüller, 1775)
Mesocrambus candiellus (Herrich-Schäffer, 1848)
Metacrambus carectellus (Zeller, 1847)
Metaeuchromius lata (Staudinger, 1870)
Metasia carnealis (Treitschke, 1829)
Metasia ophialis (Treitschke, 1829)
Metasia rosealis Ragonot, 1895
Metasia suppandalis (Hübner, 1823)
Metaxmeste phrygialis (Hübner, 1796)
Metaxmeste schrankiana (Hochenwarth, 1785)
Neocrambus wolfschlaegeri (Schawerda, 1937)
Nomophila noctuella (Denis & Schiffermüller, 1775)
Ostrinia nubilalis (Hübner, 1796)
Palpita vitrealis (Rossi, 1794)
Paracorsia repandalis (Denis & Schiffermüller, 1775)
Parapoynx stagnalis (Zeller, 1852)
Parapoynx stratiotata (Linnaeus, 1758)
Paratalanta hyalinalis (Hübner, 1796)
Pediasia contaminella (Hübner, 1796)
Pediasia fascelinella (Hübner, 1813)
Pediasia jucundellus (Herrich-Schäffer, 1847)
Pediasia luteella (Denis & Schiffermüller, 1775)
Pediasia matricella (Treitschke, 1832)
Platytes cerussella (Denis & Schiffermüller, 1775)
Pleuroptya balteata (Fabricius, 1798)
Pleuroptya ruralis (Scopoli, 1763)
Psammotis pulveralis (Hübner, 1796)
Pyrausta aerealis (Hübner, 1793)
Pyrausta aurata (Scopoli, 1763)
Pyrausta castalis Treitschke, 1829
Pyrausta cingulata (Linnaeus, 1758)
Pyrausta despicata (Scopoli, 1763)
Pyrausta obfuscata (Scopoli, 1763)
Pyrausta purpuralis (Linnaeus, 1758)
Pyrausta sanguinalis (Linnaeus, 1767)
Pyrausta trimaculalis (Staudinger, 1867)
Pyrausta virginalis Duponchel, 1832
Scirpophaga praelata (Scopoli, 1763)
Scoparia ambigualis (Treitschke, 1829)
Scoparia basistrigalis Knaggs, 1866
Scoparia dicteella Rebel, 1916
Scoparia ganevi Leraut, 1985
Scoparia graeca Nuss, 2005
Scoparia ingratella (Zeller, 1846)
Scoparia manifestella (Herrich-Schäffer, 1848)
Scoparia perplexella (Zeller, 1839)
Scoparia pyralella (Denis & Schiffermüller, 1775)
Scoparia staudingeralis (Mabille, 1869)
Scoparia subfusca Haworth, 1811
Sitochroa palealis (Denis & Schiffermüller, 1775)
Sitochroa verticalis (Linnaeus, 1758)
Tegostoma comparalis (Hübner, 1796)
Thisanotia chrysonuchella (Scopoli, 1763)
Thyridiphora furia (Swinhoe, 1884)
Titanio normalis (Hübner, 1796)
Titanio venustalis (Lederer, 1855)
Udea austriacalis (Herrich-Schäffer, 1851)
Udea bipunctalis (Herrich-Schäffer, 1851)
Udea confinalis (Lederer, 1858)
Udea ferrugalis (Hübner, 1796)
Udea fimbriatralis (Duponchel, 1834)
Udea fulvalis (Hübner, 1809)
Udea institalis (Hübner, 1819)
Udea languidalis (Eversmann, 1842)
Udea numeralis (Hübner, 1796)
Udea olivalis (Denis & Schiffermüller, 1775)
Udea prunalis (Denis & Schiffermüller, 1775)
Udea rhododendronalis (Duponchel, 1834)
Uresiphita gilvata (Fabricius, 1794)
Usgentia vespertalis (Herrich-Schäffer, 1851)
Xanthocrambus saxonellus (Zincken, 1821)

Douglasiidae
Klimeschia cinereipunctella (Turati & Fiori, 1930)
Klimeschia transversella (Zeller, 1839)
Tinagma anchusella (Benander, 1936)
Tinagma klimeschi Gaedike, 1987
Tinagma ocnerostomella (Stainton, 1850)

Drepanidae
Asphalia ruficollis (Denis & Schiffermüller, 1775)
Cilix asiatica O. Bang-Haas, 1907
Cilix glaucata (Scopoli, 1763)
Cymatophorina diluta (Denis & Schiffermüller, 1775)
Drepana falcataria (Linnaeus, 1758)
Falcaria lacertinaria (Linnaeus, 1758)
Habrosyne pyritoides (Hufnagel, 1766)
Sabra harpagula (Esper, 1786)
Tethea ocularis (Linnaeus, 1767)
Tethea or (Denis & Schiffermüller, 1775)
Thyatira batis (Linnaeus, 1758)
Watsonalla binaria (Hufnagel, 1767)
Watsonalla cultraria (Fabricius, 1775)
Watsonalla uncinula (Borkhausen, 1790)

Elachistidae
Agonopterix adspersella (Kollar, 1832)
Agonopterix alstromeriana (Clerck, 1759)
Agonopterix arenella (Denis & Schiffermüller, 1775)
Agonopterix assimilella (Treitschke, 1832)
Agonopterix atomella (Denis & Schiffermüller, 1775)
Agonopterix cnicella (Treitschke, 1832)
Agonopterix comitella (Lederer, 1855)
Agonopterix furvella (Treitschke, 1832)
Agonopterix graecella Hannemann, 1976
Agonopterix inoxiella Hannemann, 1959
Agonopterix irrorata (Staudinger, 1870)
Agonopterix leucadensis (Rebel, 1932)
Agonopterix nanatella (Stainton, 1849)
Agonopterix nervosa (Haworth, 1811)
Agonopterix pallorella (Zeller, 1839)
Agonopterix propinquella (Treitschke, 1835)
Agonopterix purpurea (Haworth, 1811)
Agonopterix rotundella (Douglas, 1846)
Agonopterix rutana (Fabricius, 1794)
Agonopterix scopariella (Heinemann, 1870)
Agonopterix straminella (Staudinger, 1859)
Agonopterix subpropinquella (Stainton, 1849)
Agonopterix thapsiella (Zeller, 1847)
Agonopterix yeatiana (Fabricius, 1781)
Anchinia laureolella Herrich-Schäffer, 1854
Blastodacna atra (Haworth, 1828)
Blastodacna hellerella (Duponchel, 1838)
Blastodacna vinolentella (Herrich-Schäffer, 1854)
Cacochroa corfuella Lvovsky, 2000
Cacochroa permixtella (Herrich-Schäffer, 1854)
Depressaria absynthiella Herrich-Schäffer, 1865
Depressaria albipunctella (Denis & Schiffermüller, 1775)
Depressaria badiella (Hübner, 1796)
Depressaria beckmanni Heinemann, 1870
Depressaria chaerophylli Zeller, 1839
Depressaria daucella (Denis & Schiffermüller, 1775)
Depressaria depressana (Fabricius, 1775)
Depressaria discipunctella Herrich-Schäffer, 1854
Depressaria douglasella Stainton, 1849
Depressaria floridella Mann, 1864
Depressaria hofmanni Stainton, 1861
Depressaria marcella Rebel, 1901
Depressaria tenebricosa Zeller, 1854
Depressaria ultimella Stainton, 1849
Depressaria velox Staudinger, 1859
Depressaria veneficella Zeller, 1847
Depressaria hirtipalpis Zeller, 1854
Dystebenna stephensi (Stainton, 1849)
Elachista antonia Kaila, 2007
Elachista atrisquamosa Staudinger, 1880
Elachista catalana Parenti, 1978
Elachista dalmatiensis Traugott-Olsen, 1992
Elachista deceptricula Staudinger, 1880
Elachista gangabella Zeller, 1850
Elachista graeca Parenti, 2002
Elachista grotenfelti Kaila, 2012
Elachista modesta Parenti, 1978
Elachista neapolisella Traugott-Olsen, 1985
Elachista nedaella Traugott-Olsen, 1985
Elachista nuraghella Amsel, 1951
Elachista occulta Parenti, 1978
Elachista pollutella Duponchel, 1843
Elachista rudectella Stainton, 1851
Elachista skulei Traugott-Olsen, 1992
Elachista subalbidella Schlager, 1847
Elachista sutteri Kaila, 2002
Elachista anatoliensis Traugott-Olsen, 1990
Elachista kalki Parenti, 1978
Elachista christenseni Traugott-Olsen, 2000
Elachista falirakiensis Traugott-Olsen, 2000
Elachista gleichenella (Fabricius, 1781)
Elachista helia Kaila & Sruoga, 2014
Elachista infuscata Frey, 1882
Elachista kosteri Traugott-Olsen, 1995
Elachista martinii O. Hofmann, 1898
Elachista minuta (Parenti, 2003)
Elachista occidentalis Frey, 1882
Elachista pigerella (Herrich-Schäffer, 1854)
Elachista rufocinerea (Haworth, 1828)
Ethmia aurifluella (Hübner, 1810)
Ethmia bipunctella (Fabricius, 1775)
Ethmia candidella (Alphéraky, 1908)
Ethmia chrysopyga (Zeller, 1844)
Ethmia distigmatella (Erschoff, 1874)
Ethmia fumidella (Wocke, 1850)
Ethmia haemorrhoidella (Eversmann, 1844)
Ethmia iranella Zerny, 1940
Ethmia mariannae Karsholt & Kun, 2003
Ethmia pusiella (Linnaeus, 1758)
Ethmia quadrinotella (Mann, 1861)
Ethmia terminella T. B. Fletcher, 1938
Exaeretia conciliatella (Rebel, 1892)
Exaeretia nigromaculata Hannemann, 1989
Haplochrois albanica (Rebel & Zerny, 1932)
Haplochrois gelechiella (Rebel, 1902)
Haplochrois ochraceella (Rebel, 1903)
Heinemannia festivella (Denis & Schiffermüller, 1775)
Hypercallia citrinalis (Scopoli, 1763)
Luquetia orientella (Rebel, 1893)
Orophia sordidella (Hübner, 1796)
Perittia echiella (de Joannis, 1902)
Perittia minitaurella Kaila, 2009
Perittia mucronata (Parenti, 2001)
Perittia ravida Kaila, 2009
Stephensia staudingeri Nielsen & Traugott-Olsen, 1981

Epermeniidae
Epermenia aequidentellus (E. Hofmann, 1867)
Epermenia chaerophyllella (Goeze, 1783)
Epermenia insecurella (Stainton, 1854)
Epermenia petrusellus (Heylaerts, 1883)
Epermenia strictellus (Wocke, 1867)
Epermenia iniquellus (Wocke, 1867)
Epermenia ochreomaculellus (Milliere, 1854)
Epermenia pontificella (Hübner, 1796)
Ochromolopis ictella (Hübner, 1813)
Ochromolopis staintonellus (Milliere, 1869)

Erebidae
Acantholipes regularis (Hübner, 1813)
Amata kruegeri (Ragusa, 1904)
Amata phegea (Linnaeus, 1758)
Apopestes spectrum (Esper, 1787)
Araeopteron ecphaea Hampson, 1914
Arctia caja (Linnaeus, 1758)
Arctia festiva (Hufnagel, 1766)
Arctia villica (Linnaeus, 1758)
Arctornis l-nigrum (Muller, 1764)
Autophila asiatica (Staudinger, 1888)
Autophila banghaasi Boursin, 1940
Autophila dilucida (Hübner, 1808)
Autophila libanotica (Staudinger, 1901)
Autophila limbata (Staudinger, 1871)
Autophila anaphanes Boursin, 1940
Autophila ligaminosa (Eversmann, 1851)
Callimorpha dominula (Linnaeus, 1758)
Calliteara pudibunda (Linnaeus, 1758)
Calymma communimacula (Denis & Schiffermüller, 1775)
Calyptra thalictri (Borkhausen, 1790)
Catephia alchymista (Denis & Schiffermüller, 1775)
Catocala brandti Hacker, 1999
Catocala coniuncta (Esper, 1787)
Catocala conversa (Esper, 1783)
Catocala dilecta (Hübner, 1808)
Catocala disjuncta (Geyer, 1828)
Catocala diversa (Geyer, 1828)
Catocala electa (Vieweg, 1790)
Catocala elocata (Esper, 1787)
Catocala eutychea Treitschke, 1835
Catocala hymenaea (Denis & Schiffermüller, 1775)
Catocala lupina Herrich-Schäffer, 1851
Catocala nupta (Linnaeus, 1767)
Catocala nymphaea (Esper, 1787)
Catocala nymphagoga (Esper, 1787)
Catocala promissa (Denis & Schiffermüller, 1775)
Catocala puerpera (Giorna, 1791)
Catocala separata Freyer, 1848
Catocala sponsa (Linnaeus, 1767)
Chelis maculosa (Gerning, 1780)
Clytie syriaca (Bugnion, 1837)
Colobochyla salicalis (Denis & Schiffermüller, 1775)
Coscinia striata (Linnaeus, 1758)
Cybosia mesomella (Linnaeus, 1758)
Cymbalophora pudica (Esper, 1785)
Cymbalophora rivularis (Menetries, 1832)
Diacrisia sannio (Linnaeus, 1758)
Diaphora luctuosa (Hübner, 1831)
Diaphora mendica (Clerck, 1759)
Dicallomera fascelina (Linnaeus, 1758)
Drasteria cailino (Lefebvre, 1827)
Dysauxes ancilla (Linnaeus, 1767)
Dysauxes famula (Freyer, 1836)
Dysauxes punctata (Fabricius, 1781)
Dysgonia algira (Linnaeus, 1767)
Dysgonia torrida (Guenée, 1852)
Eilema caniola (Hübner, 1808)
Eilema complana (Linnaeus, 1758)
Eilema costalis (Zeller, 1847)
Eilema depressa (Esper, 1787)
Eilema lurideola (Zincken, 1817)
Eilema muscula (Staudinger, 1899)
Eilema palliatella (Scopoli, 1763)
Eilema pseudocomplana (Daniel, 1939)
Eilema pygmaeola (Doubleday, 1847)
Eilema rungsi Toulgoët, 1960
Eilema sororcula (Hufnagel, 1766)
Eublemma amoena (Hübner, 1803)
Eublemma candidana (Fabricius, 1794)
Eublemma cochylioides (Guenée, 1852)
Eublemma minutata (Fabricius, 1794)
Eublemma ochreola (Staudinger, 1900)
Eublemma ostrina (Hübner, 1808)
Eublemma panonica (Freyer, 1840)
Eublemma parva (Hübner, 1808)
Eublemma polygramma (Duponchel, 1842)
Eublemma pudorina (Staudinger, 1889)
Eublemma purpurina (Denis & Schiffermüller, 1775)
Eublemma rosea (Hübner, 1790)
Eublemma scitula Rambur, 1833
Eublemma straminea (Staudinger, 1892)
Eublemma viridula (Guenée, 1841)
Eublemma zillii Fibiger, Ronkay & Yela, 2010
Euclidia mi (Clerck, 1759)
Euclidia glyphica (Linnaeus, 1758)
Euclidia triquetra (Denis & Schiffermüller, 1775)
Euplagia quadripunctaria (Poda, 1761)
Euproctis chrysorrhoea (Linnaeus, 1758)
Euproctis similis (Fuessly, 1775)
Exophyla rectangularis (Geyer, 1828)
Grammodes bifasciata (Petagna, 1787)
Grammodes stolida (Fabricius, 1775)
Herminia tarsicrinalis (Knoch, 1782)
Honeyania ragusana (Freyer, 1844)
Hypena lividalis (Hübner, 1796)
Hypena munitalis Mann, 1861
Hypena obesalis Treitschke, 1829
Hypena obsitalis (Hübner, 1813)
Hypena palpalis (Hübner, 1796)
Hypena proboscidalis (Linnaeus, 1758)
Hypena rostralis (Linnaeus, 1758)
Hypenodes anatolica Schwingenschuss, 1938
Hypenodes nesiota Rebel, 1916
Hyphantria cunea (Drury, 1773)
Idia calvaria (Denis & Schiffermüller, 1775)
Laelia coenosa (Hübner, 1808)
Laspeyria flexula (Denis & Schiffermüller, 1775)
Leucoma salicis (Linnaeus, 1758)
Lithosia quadra (Linnaeus, 1758)
Lygephila amasina (Staudinger, 1878)
Lygephila craccae (Denis & Schiffermüller, 1775)
Lygephila lusoria (Linnaeus, 1758)
Lygephila procax (Hübner, 1813)
Lygephila viciae (Hübner, 1822)
Lymantria dispar (Linnaeus, 1758)
Lymantria monacha (Linnaeus, 1758)
Macrochilo cribrumalis (Hübner, 1793)
Metachrostis dardouini (Boisduval, 1840)
Metachrostis velocior (Staudinger, 1892)
Metachrostis velox (Hübner, 1813)
Micronoctua karsholti Fibiger, 1997
Miltochrista miniata (Forster, 1771)
Minucia lunaris (Denis & Schiffermüller, 1775)
Nodaria nodosalis (Herrich-Schäffer, 1851)
Ocneria eos Reisser, 1962
Ocneria ledereri (Milliere, 1869)
Ocneria rubea (Denis & Schiffermüller, 1775)
Ocnogyna loewii (Zeller, 1846)
Ocnogyna parasita (Hübner, 1790)
Odice arcuinna (Hübner, 1790)
Odice suava (Hübner, 1813)
Ophiusa tirhaca (Cramer, 1773)
Orectis massiliensis (Milliere, 1864)
Orectis proboscidata (Herrich-Schäffer, 1851)
Orgyia antiqua (Linnaeus, 1758)
Paidia cinerascens (Herrich-Schäffer, 1847)
Paidia minoica de Freina, 2006
Paidia rica (Freyer, 1858)
Pandesma robusta (Walker, 1858)
Paracolax tristalis (Fabricius, 1794)
Parascotia detersa (Staudinger, 1891)
Parascotia fuliginaria (Linnaeus, 1761)
Parasemia plantaginis (Linnaeus, 1758)
Parocneria detrita (Esper, 1785)
Parocneria terebinthi (Freyer, 1838)
Pechipogo plumigeralis Hübner, 1825
Pelosia muscerda (Hufnagel, 1766)
Pelosia obtusa (Herrich-Schäffer, 1852)
Pericyma albidentaria (Freyer, 1842)
Phragmatobia fuliginosa (Linnaeus, 1758)
Phragmatobia placida (Frivaldszky, 1835)
Phytometra viridaria (Clerck, 1759)
Polypogon tentacularia (Linnaeus, 1758)
Raparna conicephala (Staudinger, 1870)
Rhypagla lacernaria (Hübner, 1813)
Rhyparia purpurata (Linnaeus, 1758)
Rivula sericealis (Scopoli, 1763)
Rivula tanitalis Rebel, 1912
Schrankia costaestrigalis (Stephens, 1834)
Scoliopteryx libatrix (Linnaeus, 1758)
Setina irrorella (Linnaeus, 1758)
Simplicia rectalis (Eversmann, 1842)
Spilosoma lubricipeda (Linnaeus, 1758)
Spilosoma lutea (Hufnagel, 1766)
Spilosoma urticae (Esper, 1789)
Tathorhynchus exsiccata (Lederer, 1855)
Tyria jacobaeae (Linnaeus, 1758)
Utetheisa pulchella (Linnaeus, 1758)
Watsonarctia deserta (Bartel, 1902)
Zanclognatha lunalis (Scopoli, 1763)
Zanclognatha zelleralis (Wocke, 1850)
Zebeeba falsalis (Herrich-Schäffer, 1839)
Zekelita ravalis (Herrich-Schäffer, 1851)
Zekelita antiqualis (Hübner, 1809)
Zethes insularis Rambur, 1833

Eriocraniidae
Dyseriocrania subpurpurella (Haworth, 1828)

Euteliidae
Eutelia adoratrix (Staudinger, 1892)
Eutelia adulatrix (Hübner, 1813)

Gelechiidae
Acompsia cinerella (Clerck, 1759)
Acompsia ponomarenkoae Huemer & Karsholt, 2002
Agnippe lunaki (Rebel, 1941)
Altenia elsneriella Huemer & Karsholt, 1999
Altenia modesta (Danilevsky, 1955)
Altenia scriptella (Hübner, 1796)
Altenia wagneriella (Rebel, 1926)
Anacampsis malella Amsel, 1959
Anacampsis obscurella (Denis & Schiffermüller, 1775)
Anacampsis scintillella (Fischer von Röslerstamm, 1841)
Anacampsis timidella (Wocke, 1887)
Anarsia lineatella Zeller, 1839
Anarsia spartiella (Schrank, 1802)
Apodia bifractella (Duponchel, 1843)
Aproaerema anthyllidella (Hübner, 1813)
Aristotelia brizella (Treitschke, 1833)
Aristotelia decurtella (Hübner, 1813)
Aristotelia ericinella (Zeller, 1839)
Aristotelia subericinella (Duponchel, 1843)
Aroga aristotelis (Milliere, 1876)
Aroga balcanicola Huemer & Karsholt, 1999
Aroga velocella (Duponchel, 1838)
Athrips amoenella (Frey, 1882)
Athrips rancidella (Herrich-Schäffer, 1854)
Atremaea lonchoptera Staudinger, 1871
Brachmia blandella (Fabricius, 1798)
Bryotropha affinis (Haworth, 1828)
Bryotropha arabica Amsel, 1952
Bryotropha azovica Bidzilia, 1997
Bryotropha desertella (Douglas, 1850)
Bryotropha domestica (Haworth, 1828)
Bryotropha dryadella (Zeller, 1850)
Bryotropha figulella (Staudinger, 1859)
Bryotropha hendrikseni Karsholt & Rutten, 2005
Bryotropha hulli Karsholt & Rutten, 2005
Bryotropha plebejella (Zeller, 1847)
Bryotropha sabulosella (Rebel, 1905)
Bryotropha sattleri Nel, 2003
Bryotropha senectella (Zeller, 1839)
Bryotropha sutteri Karsholt & Rutten, 2005
Bryotropha tachyptilella (Rebel, 1916)
Bryotropha terrella (Denis & Schiffermüller, 1775)
Carpatolechia aenigma (Sattler, 1983)
Carpatolechia decorella (Haworth, 1812)
Carpatolechia fugitivella (Zeller, 1839)
Caryocolum alsinella (Zeller, 1868)
Caryocolum amaurella (M. Hering, 1924)
Caryocolum baischi Huemer & Karsholt, 2010
Caryocolum blandella (Douglas, 1852)
Caryocolum blandelloides Karsholt, 1981
Caryocolum blandulella (Tutt, 1887)
Caryocolum cauligenella (Schmid, 1863)
Caryocolum confluens Huemer, 1988
Caryocolum crypticum Huemer, Karsholt & Mutanen, 2014
Caryocolum fibigerium Huemer, 1988
Caryocolum hispanicum Huemer, 1988
Caryocolum junctella (Douglas, 1851)
Caryocolum leucomelanella (Zeller, 1839)
Caryocolum marmorea (Haworth, 1828)
Caryocolum moehringiae (Klimesch, 1954)
Caryocolum mucronatella (Chrétien, 1900)
Caryocolum peregrinella (Herrich-Schäffer, 1854)
Caryocolum provinciella (Stainton, 1869)
Caryocolum proxima (Haworth, 1828)
Caryocolum saginella (Zeller, 1868)
Caryocolum schleichi (Christoph, 1872)
Caryocolum tischeriella (Zeller, 1839)
Caryocolum vicinella (Douglas, 1851)
Catatinagma trivittellum Rebel, 1903
Caulastrocecis pudicellus (Mann, 1861)
Chionodes distinctella (Zeller, 1839)
Chionodes electella (Zeller, 1839)
Chionodes fumatella (Douglas, 1850)
Chrysoesthia drurella (Fabricius, 1775)
Chrysoesthia sexguttella (Thunberg, 1794)
Cosmardia moritzella (Treitschke, 1835)
Crossobela trinotella (Herrich-Schäffer, 1856)
Deltophora maculata (Staudinger, 1879)
Dichomeris acuminatus (Staudinger, 1876)
Dichomeris alacella (Zeller, 1839)
Dichomeris lamprostoma (Zeller, 1847)
Dichomeris limbipunctellus (Staudinger, 1859)
Dichomeris marginella (Fabricius, 1781)
Dichomeris ustalella (Fabricius, 1794)
Dirhinosia arnoldiella (Rebel, 1905)
Ephysteris deserticolella (Staudinger, 1871)
Ephysteris diminutella (Zeller, 1847)
Ephysteris iberica Povolny, 1977
Ephysteris olympica Povolny, 1968
Ephysteris promptella (Staudinger, 1859)
Epidola barcinonella Milliere, 1867
Epidola stigma Staudinger, 1859
Eulamprotes graecatella Šumpich & Skyva, 2012
Eulamprotes helotella (Staudinger, 1859)
Eulamprotes nigromaculella (Milliere, 1872)
Eulamprotes wilkella (Linnaeus, 1758)
Exoteleia dodecella (Linnaeus, 1758)
Filatima spurcella (Duponchel, 1843)
Gelechia dujardini Huemer, 1991
Gelechia mediterranea Huemer, 1991
Gelechia nigra (Haworth, 1828)
Gelechia sabinellus (Zeller, 1839)
Gelechia scotinella Herrich-Schäffer, 1854
Gelechia senticetella (Staudinger, 1859)
Gelechia sororculella (Hübner, 1817)
Gnorimoschema soffneri Riedl, 1965
Harpagidia magnetella (Staudinger, 1871)
Helcystogramma lutatella (Herrich-Schäffer, 1854)
Helcystogramma rufescens (Haworth, 1828)
Helcystogramma triannulella (Herrich-Schäffer, 1854)
Isophrictis anthemidella (Wocke, 1871)
Isophrictis kefersteiniellus (Zeller, 1850)
Isophrictis lineatellus (Zeller, 1850)
Isophrictis striatella (Denis & Schiffermüller, 1775)
Istrianis femoralis (Staudinger, 1876)
Istrianis myricariella (Frey, 1870)
Klimeschiopsis kiningerella (Duponchel, 1843)
Lutilabria lutilabrella (Mann, 1857)
Megacraspedus binotella (Duponchel, 1843)
Megacraspedus cerussatellus Rebel, 1930
Megacraspedus incertellus Rebel, 1930
Megacraspedus separatellus (Fischer von Röslerstamm, 1843)
Mesophleps corsicella Herrich-Schäffer, 1856
Mesophleps ochracella (Turati, 1926)
Mesophleps oxycedrella (Milliere, 1871)
Mesophleps silacella (Hübner, 1796)
Metzneria aestivella (Zeller, 1839)
Metzneria agraphella (Ragonot, 1895)
Metzneria aprilella (Herrich-Schäffer, 1854)
Metzneria campicolella (Mann, 1857)
Metzneria castiliella (Moschler, 1866)
Metzneria diffusella Englert, 1974
Metzneria intestinella (Mann, 1864)
Metzneria lappella (Linnaeus, 1758)
Metzneria metzneriella (Stainton, 1851)
Metzneria neuropterella (Zeller, 1839)
Metzneria paucipunctella (Zeller, 1839)
Metzneria riadella Englert, 1974
Metzneria tenuiella (Mann, 1864)
Microlechia chretieni Turati, 1924
Microlechia rhamnifoliae (Amsel & Hering, 1931)
Mirificarma aflavella (Amsel, 1935)
Mirificarma cytisella (Treitschke, 1833)
Mirificarma eburnella (Denis & Schiffermüller, 1775)
Mirificarma flavella (Duponchel, 1844)
Mirificarma maculatella (Hübner, 1796)
Mirificarma minimella Huemer & Karsholt, 2001
Mirificarma mulinella (Zeller, 1839)
Mirificarma rhodoptera (Mann, 1866)
Monochroa cytisella (Curtis, 1837)
Monochroa rumicetella (O. Hofmann, 1868)
Monochroa tenebrella (Hübner, 1817)
Neofriseria peliella (Treitschke, 1835)
Neotelphusa cisti (Stainton, 1869)
Neotelphusa sequax (Haworth, 1828)
Nothris congressariella (Bruand, 1858)
Nothris magna Nel & Peslier, 2007
Nothris verbascella (Denis & Schiffermüller, 1775)
Ochrodia subdiminutella (Stainton, 1867)
Ornativalva heluanensis (Debski, 1913)
Ornativalva plutelliformis (Staudinger, 1859)
Palumbina guerinii (Stainton, 1858)
Parastenolechia nigrinotella (Zeller, 1847)
Pectinophora gossypiella (Saunders, 1844)
Pexicopia malvella (Hübner, 1805)
Phthorimaea operculella (Zeller, 1873)
Platyedra subcinerea (Haworth, 1828)
Pogochaetia solitaria Staudinger, 1879
Prolita sexpunctella (Fabricius, 1794)
Prolita solutella (Zeller, 1839)
Pseudotelphusa istrella (Mann, 1866)
Pseudotelphusa scalella (Scopoli, 1763)
Psoricoptera gibbosella (Zeller, 1839)
Ptocheuusa inopella (Zeller, 1839)
Ptocheuusa paupella (Zeller, 1847)
Pyncostola bohemiella (Nickerl, 1864)
Recurvaria nanella (Denis & Schiffermüller, 1775)
Schneidereria pistaciella Weber, 1957
Scrobipalpa acuminatella (Sircom, 1850)
Scrobipalpa artemisiella (Treitschke, 1833)
Scrobipalpa atriplicella (Fischer von Röslerstamm, 1841)
Scrobipalpa bigoti Povolny, 1973
Scrobipalpa brahmiella (Heyden, 1862)
Scrobipalpa bryophiloides Povolny, 1966
Scrobipalpa camphorosmella Nel, 1999
Scrobipalpa ergasima (Meyrick, 1916)
Scrobipalpa gecho (Walsingham, 1911)
Scrobipalpa hendrikseni Huemer & Karsholt, 2010
Scrobipalpa instabilella (Douglas, 1846)
Scrobipalpa kasyi Povolny, 1968
Scrobipalpa obsoletella (Fischer von Röslerstamm, 1841)
Scrobipalpa ocellatella (Boyd, 1858)
Scrobipalpa perinii (Klimesch, 1951)
Scrobipalpa phagnalella (Constant, 1895)
Scrobipalpa proclivella (Fuchs, 1886)
Scrobipalpa salinella (Zeller, 1847)
Scrobipalpa samadensis (Pfaffenzeller, 1870)
Scrobipalpa selectella (Caradja, 1920)
Scrobipalpa spergulariella (Chrétien, 1910)
Scrobipalpa vasconiella (Rossler, 1877)
Scrobipalpa vicaria (Meyrick, 1921)
Scrobipalpula psilella (Herrich-Schäffer, 1854)
Scrobipalpula seniorum Povolny, 2000
Scrobipalpula tussilaginis (Stainton, 1867)
Sitotroga cerealella (Olivier, 1789)
Sitotroga psacasta Meyrick, 1908
Sophronia chilonella (Treitschke, 1833)
Sophronia finitimella Rebel, 1905
Sophronia humerella (Denis & Schiffermüller, 1775)
Sophronia sicariellus (Zeller, 1839)
Stenolechia gemmella (Linnaeus, 1758)
Stenolechiodes macrolepiellus Huemer & Karsholt, 1999
Stenolechiodes pseudogemmellus Elsner, 1996
Stomopteryx basalis (Staudinger, 1876)
Stomopteryx detersella (Zeller, 1847)
Stomopteryx hungaricella Gozmány, 1957
Stomopteryx remissella (Zeller, 1847)
Streyella anguinella (Herrich-Schäffer, 1861)
Syncopacma cinctella (Clerck, 1759)
Syncopacma patruella (Mann, 1857)
Syncopacma polychromella (Rebel, 1902)
Syncopacma sangiella (Stainton, 1863)
Syncopacma suecicella (Wolff, 1958)
Teleiodes albiluculella Huemer & Karsholt, 2001
Teleiodes luculella (Hübner, 1813)
Teleiodes vulgella (Denis & Schiffermüller, 1775)
Teleiopsis bagriotella (Duponchel, 1840)
Teleiopsis diffinis (Haworth, 1828)
Teleiopsis terebinthinella (Herrich-Schäffer, 1856)
Telphusa cistiflorella (Constant, 1890)
Thiotricha majorella (Rebel, 1910)
Tuta absoluta (Meyrick, 1917)
Xenolechia aethiops (Humphreys & Westwood, 1845)
Xenolechia lindae Huemer & Karsholt, 1999
Xenolechia pseudovulgella Huemer & Karsholt, 1999

Geometridae
Abraxas grossulariata (Linnaeus, 1758)
Acanthovalva inconspicuaria (Hübner, 1819)
Acasis viretata (Hübner, 1799)
Agriopis bajaria (Denis & Schiffermüller, 1775)
Alcis jubata (Thunberg, 1788)
Alcis repandata (Linnaeus, 1758)
Aleucis orientalis (Staudinger, 1892)
Alsophila aescularia (Denis & Schiffermüller, 1775)
Amorphogynia necessaria (Zeller, 1849)
Angerona prunaria (Linnaeus, 1758)
Apeira syringaria (Linnaeus, 1758)
Aplasta ononaria (Fuessly, 1783)
Aplocera annexata (Freyer, 1830)
Aplocera columbata (Metzner, 1845)
Aplocera cretica (Reisser, 1974)
Aplocera efformata (Guenée, 1858)
Aplocera plagiata (Linnaeus, 1758)
Aplocera praeformata (Hübner, 1826)
Aplocera simpliciata (Treitschke, 1835)
Apocheima hispidaria (Denis & Schiffermüller, 1775)
Apochima flabellaria (Heeger, 1838)
Ascotis selenaria (Denis & Schiffermüller, 1775)
Asovia maeoticaria (Alphéraky, 1876)
Aspitates ochrearia (Rossi, 1794)
Asthena albulata (Hufnagel, 1767)
Biston betularia (Linnaeus, 1758)
Bupalus piniaria (Linnaeus, 1758)
Cabera pusaria (Linnaeus, 1758)
Campaea honoraria (Denis & Schiffermüller, 1775)
Campaea margaritaria (Linnaeus, 1761)
Camptogramma bilineata (Linnaeus, 1758)
Camptogramma grisescens (Staudinger, 1892)
Casilda antophilaria (Hübner, 1813)
Cataclysme riguata (Hübner, 1813)
Catarhoe basochesiata (Duponchel, 1831)
Catarhoe hortulanaria (Staudinger, 1879)
Catarhoe permixtaria (Herrich-Schäffer, 1856)
Catarhoe putridaria (Herrich-Schäffer, 1852)
Celonoptera mirificaria Lederer, 1862
Chariaspilates formosaria (Eversmann, 1837)
Charissa certhiatus (Rebel & Zerny, 1931)
Charissa obscurata (Denis & Schiffermüller, 1775)
Charissa mutilata (Staudinger, 1879)
Charissa pullata (Denis & Schiffermüller, 1775)
Charissa dubitaria (Staudinger, 1892)
Charissa mucidaria (Hübner, 1799)
Charissa variegata (Duponchel, 1830)
Charissa ambiguata (Duponchel, 1830)
Charissa onustaria (Herrich-Schäffer, 1852)
Charissa zeitunaria (Staudinger, 1901)
Charissa intermedia (Wehrli, 1917)
Charissa supinaria (Mann, 1854)
Charissa glaucinaria (Hübner, 1799)
Chemerina caliginearia (Rambur, 1833)
Chesias rufata (Fabricius, 1775)
Chiasmia aestimaria (Hübner, 1809)
Chiasmia clathrata (Linnaeus, 1758)
Chiasmia syriacaria (Staudinger, 1871)
Chlorissa cloraria (Hübner, 1813)
Chlorissa viridata (Linnaeus, 1758)
Chloroclysta siterata (Hufnagel, 1767)
Chloroclystis v-ata (Haworth, 1809)
Cidaria fulvata (Forster, 1771)
Cleorodes lichenaria (Hufnagel, 1767)
Cleta filacearia (Herrich-Schäffer, 1847)
Coenotephria ablutaria (Boisduval, 1840)
Colostygia aptata (Hübner, 1813)
Colostygia aqueata (Hübner, 1813)
Colostygia fitzi (Schawerda, 1914)
Colostygia olivata (Denis & Schiffermüller, 1775)
Colostygia wolfschlaegerae (Pinker, 1953)
Colotois pennaria (Linnaeus, 1761)
Comibaena bajularia (Denis & Schiffermüller, 1775)
Cosmorhoe ocellata (Linnaeus, 1758)
Costaconvexa polygrammata (Borkhausen, 1794)
Crocallis elinguaria (Linnaeus, 1758)
Crocallis helenaria Ruckdeschel, 2006
Crocallis tusciaria (Borkhausen, 1793)
Cyclophora linearia (Hübner, 1799)
Cyclophora porata (Linnaeus, 1767)
Cyclophora punctaria (Linnaeus, 1758)
Cyclophora suppunctaria (Zeller, 1847)
Cyclophora albiocellaria (Hübner, 1789)
Cyclophora annularia (Fabricius, 1775)
Cyclophora ariadne Reisser, 1939
Cyclophora puppillaria (Hübner, 1799)
Cyclophora quercimontaria (Bastelberger, 1897)
Cyclophora ruficiliaria (Herrich-Schäffer, 1855)
Dasycorsa modesta (Staudinger, 1879)
Deileptenia ribeata (Clerck, 1759)
Docirava dervenaria (von Mentzer, 1981)
Docirava mundulata (Guenée, 1858)
Dyscia conspersaria (Denis & Schiffermüller, 1775)
Dyscia crassipunctaria (Rebel, 1916)
Dyscia innocentaria (Christoph, 1885)
Dyscia raunaria (Freyer, 1852)
Dysstroma truncata (Hufnagel, 1767)
Eilicrinia cordiaria (Hübner, 1790)
Eilicrinia trinotata (Metzner, 1845)
Ematurga atomaria (Linnaeus, 1758)
Ennomos alniaria (Linnaeus, 1758)
Ennomos duercki Reisser, 1958
Ennomos quercaria (Hübner, 1813)
Ennomos quercinaria (Hufnagel, 1767)
Entephria cyanata (Hübner, 1809)
Entephria flavicinctata (Hübner, 1813)
Epione repandaria (Hufnagel, 1767)
Epirrhoe alternata (Muller, 1764)
Epirrhoe galiata (Denis & Schiffermüller, 1775)
Epirrhoe molluginata (Hübner, 1813)
Epirrhoe rivata (Hübner, 1813)
Epirrita dilutata (Denis & Schiffermüller, 1775)
Epirrita terminassianae Vardikian, 1974
Eucrostes indigenata (de Villers, 1789)
Eulithis peloponnesiaca (Rebel, 1902)
Eulithis populata (Linnaeus, 1758)
Eulithis prunata (Linnaeus, 1758)
Eumannia oppositaria (Mann, 1864)
Eumannia psyloritaria (Reisser, 1958)
Eumera regina Staudinger, 1892
Euphyia biangulata (Haworth, 1809)
Euphyia frustata (Treitschke, 1828)
Euphyia unangulata (Haworth, 1809)
Eupithecia abietaria (Goeze, 1781)
Eupithecia absinthiata (Clerck, 1759)
Eupithecia addictata Dietze, 1908
Eupithecia alliaria Staudinger, 1870
Eupithecia antalica Mironov, 2001
Eupithecia biornata Christoph, 1867
Eupithecia breviculata (Donzel, 1837)
Eupithecia carpophagata Staudinger, 1871
Eupithecia centaureata (Denis & Schiffermüller, 1775)
Eupithecia cerussaria (Lederer, 1855)
Eupithecia cretaceata (Packard, 1874)
Eupithecia cuculliaria (Rebel, 1901)
Eupithecia denotata (Hübner, 1813)
Eupithecia distinctaria Herrich-Schäffer, 1848
Eupithecia dodoneata Guenée, 1858
Eupithecia druentiata Dietze, 1902
Eupithecia ericeata (Rambur, 1833)
Eupithecia extraversaria Herrich-Schäffer, 1852
Eupithecia extremata (Fabricius, 1787)
Eupithecia fuscicostata Christoph, 1887
Eupithecia gemellata Herrich-Schäffer, 1861
Eupithecia graphata (Treitschke, 1828)
Eupithecia gratiosata Herrich-Schäffer, 1861
Eupithecia gueneata Milliere, 1862
Eupithecia haworthiata Doubleday, 1856
Eupithecia icterata (de Villers, 1789)
Eupithecia impurata (Hübner, 1813)
Eupithecia innotata (Hufnagel, 1767)
Eupithecia insigniata (Hübner, 1790)
Eupithecia intricata (Zetterstedt, 1839)
Eupithecia irriguata (Hübner, 1813)
Eupithecia laquaearia Herrich-Schäffer, 1848
Eupithecia lentiscata Mabille, 1869
Eupithecia limbata Staudinger, 1879
Eupithecia linariata (Denis & Schiffermüller, 1775)
Eupithecia millefoliata Rossler, 1866
Eupithecia mystica Dietze, 1910
Eupithecia ochridata Schutze & Pinker, 1968
Eupithecia oxycedrata (Rambur, 1833)
Eupithecia pauxillaria Boisduval, 1840
Eupithecia phoeniceata (Rambur, 1834)
Eupithecia pimpinellata (Hübner, 1813)
Eupithecia plumbeolata (Haworth, 1809)
Eupithecia pulchellata Stephens, 1831
Eupithecia pusillata (Denis & Schiffermüller, 1775)
Eupithecia pyreneata Mabille, 1871
Eupithecia quercetica Prout, 1938
Eupithecia reisserata Pinker, 1976
Eupithecia riparia Herrich-Schäffer, 1851
Eupithecia satyrata (Hübner, 1813)
Eupithecia scalptata Christoph, 1885
Eupithecia schiefereri Bohatsch, 1893
Eupithecia scopariata (Rambur, 1833)
Eupithecia semigraphata Bruand, 1850
Eupithecia silenicolata Mabille, 1867
Eupithecia simpliciata (Haworth, 1809)
Eupithecia spissilineata (Metzner, 1846)
Eupithecia subfuscata (Haworth, 1809)
Eupithecia succenturiata (Linnaeus, 1758)
Eupithecia tantillaria Boisduval, 1840
Eupithecia thurnerata Schutze, 1958
Eupithecia ultimaria Boisduval, 1840
Eupithecia unedonata Mabille, 1868
Eupithecia venosata (Fabricius, 1787)
Eupithecia virgaureata Doubleday, 1861
Fagivorina arenaria (Hufnagel, 1767)
Gagitodes sagittata (Fabricius, 1787)
Gandaritis pyraliata (Denis & Schiffermüller, 1775)
Gnopharmia stevenaria (Boisduval, 1840)
Gnophos sartata Treitschke, 1827
Gnophos furvata (Denis & Schiffermüller, 1775)
Gnophos obfuscata (Denis & Schiffermüller, 1775)
Gnophos dumetata Treitschke, 1827
Gnophos zacharia Staudinger, 1879
Gymnoscelis rufifasciata (Haworth, 1809)
Gypsochroa renitidata (Hübner, 1817)
Heliomata glarearia (Denis & Schiffermüller, 1775)
Hemistola chrysoprasaria (Esper, 1795)
Hemithea aestivaria (Hübner, 1789)
Horisme corticata (Treitschke, 1835)
Horisme radicaria (de La Harpe, 1855)
Horisme tersata (Denis & Schiffermüller, 1775)
Horisme vitalbata (Denis & Schiffermüller, 1775)
Hylaea fasciaria (Linnaeus, 1758)
Hypomecis punctinalis (Scopoli, 1763)
Hypomecis roboraria (Denis & Schiffermüller, 1775)
Idaea albitorquata (Pungeler, 1909)
Idaea aureolaria (Denis & Schiffermüller, 1775)
Idaea aversata (Linnaeus, 1758)
Idaea biselata (Hufnagel, 1767)
Idaea camparia (Herrich-Schäffer, 1852)
Idaea circuitaria (Hübner, 1819)
Idaea consanguinaria (Lederer, 1853)
Idaea consolidata (Lederer, 1853)
Idaea degeneraria (Hübner, 1799)
Idaea determinata (Staudinger, 1876)
Idaea deversaria (Herrich-Schäffer, 1847)
Idaea dilutaria (Hübner, 1799)
Idaea dimidiata (Hufnagel, 1767)
Idaea distinctaria (Boisduval, 1840)
Idaea elongaria (Rambur, 1833)
Idaea emarginata (Linnaeus, 1758)
Idaea filicata (Hübner, 1799)
Idaea fuscovenosa (Goeze, 1781)
Idaea humiliata (Hufnagel, 1767)
Idaea infirmaria (Rambur, 1833)
Idaea inquinata (Scopoli, 1763)
Idaea intermedia (Staudinger, 1879)
Idaea laevigata (Scopoli, 1763)
Idaea leipnitzi Hausmann, 2004
Idaea longaria (Herrich-Schäffer, 1852)
Idaea metohiensis (Rebel, 1900)
Idaea moniliata (Denis & Schiffermüller, 1775)
Idaea obsoletaria (Rambur, 1833)
Idaea ochrata (Scopoli, 1763)
Idaea ossiculata (Lederer, 1870)
Idaea ostrinaria (Hübner, 1813)
Idaea palaestinensis (Sterneck, 1933)
Idaea pallidata (Denis & Schiffermüller, 1775)
Idaea politaria (Hübner, 1799)
Idaea rubraria (Staudinger, 1901)
Idaea rufaria (Hübner, 1799)
Idaea rusticata (Denis & Schiffermüller, 1775)
Idaea seriata (Schrank, 1802)
Idaea sericeata (Hübner, 1813)
Idaea straminata (Borkhausen, 1794)
Idaea subsericeata (Haworth, 1809)
Idaea tineata (Thierry-Mieg, 1911)
Idaea trigeminata (Haworth, 1809)
Idaea troglodytaria (Heydenreich, 1851)
Isturgia arenacearia (Denis & Schiffermüller, 1775)
Isturgia berytaria (Staudinger, 1892)
Jodis lactearia (Linnaeus, 1758)
Larentia clavaria (Haworth, 1809)
Larentia malvata (Rambur, 1833)
Ligdia adustata (Denis & Schiffermüller, 1775)
Lithostege farinata (Hufnagel, 1767)
Lithostege palaestinensis Amsel, 1935
Lomaspilis bithynica Wehrli, 1954
Lycia graecarius (Staudinger, 1861)
Lycia hirtaria (Clerck, 1759)
Lythria purpuraria (Linnaeus, 1758)
Macaria artesiaria (Denis & Schiffermüller, 1775)
Macaria liturata (Clerck, 1759)
Macaria notata (Linnaeus, 1758)
Macaria signaria (Hübner, 1809)
Macaria wauaria (Linnaeus, 1758)
Mattia adlata (Staudinger, 1895)
Melanthia procellata (Denis & Schiffermüller, 1775)
Menophra abruptaria (Thunberg, 1792)
Menophra berenicidaria (Turati, 1924)
Menophra japygiaria (O. Costa, 1849)
Microloxia herbaria (Hübner, 1813)
Minoa murinata (Scopoli, 1763)
Myinodes shohami Hausmann, 1994
Nebula achromaria (de La Harpe, 1853)
Nebula nebulata (Treitschke, 1828)
Nebula schneideraria (Lederer, 1855)
Nebula senectaria (Herrich-Schäffer, 1852)
Nychiodes amygdalaria (Herrich-Schäffer, 1848)
Nychiodes dalmatina Wagner, 1909
Nychiodes waltheri Wagner, 1919
Nychiodes obscuraria (de Villers, 1789)
Nycterosea obstipata (Fabricius, 1794)
Odezia atrata (Linnaeus, 1758)
Odontopera graecarius (A. Bang-Haas, 1910)
Opisthograptis luteolata (Linnaeus, 1758)
Ortaliella gruneraria (Staudinger, 1862)
Orthostixis cribraria (Hübner, 1799)
Oulobophora externaria (Herrich-Schäffer, 1848)
Oulobophora internata (Pungeler, 1888)
Ourapteryx sambucaria (Linnaeus, 1758)
Pachycnemia hippocastanaria (Hübner, 1799)
Pachycnemia tibiaria (Rambur, 1829)
Paraboarmia viertlii (Bohatsch, 1883)
Pareulype lasithiotica (Rebel, 1906)
Pasiphila debiliata (Hübner, 1817)
Pasiphila rectangulata (Linnaeus, 1758)
Pennithera ulicata (Rambur, 1934)
Perconia strigillaria (Hübner, 1787)
Peribatodes correptaria (Zeller, 1847)
Peribatodes ilicaria (Geyer, 1833)
Peribatodes rhomboidaria (Denis & Schiffermüller, 1775)
Peribatodes secundaria (Denis & Schiffermüller, 1775)
Peribatodes umbraria (Hübner, 1809)
Perizoma albulata (Denis & Schiffermüller, 1775)
Perizoma alchemillata (Linnaeus, 1758)
Perizoma bifaciata (Haworth, 1809)
Perizoma flavosparsata (Wagner, 1926)
Perizoma minorata (Treitschke, 1828)
Petrophora chlorosata (Scopoli, 1763)
Phaiogramma etruscaria (Zeller, 1849)
Phaiogramma faustinata (Milliere, 1868)
Phigalia pilosaria (Denis & Schiffermüller, 1775)
Philereme transversata (Hufnagel, 1767)
Plagodis pulveraria (Linnaeus, 1758)
Plemyria rubiginata (Denis & Schiffermüller, 1775)
Problepsis ocellata (Frivaldszky, 1845)
Proteuchloris neriaria (Herrich-Schäffer, 1852)
Protorhoe corollaria (Herrich-Schäffer, 1848)
Protorhoe unicata (Guenée, 1858)
Pseudopanthera macularia (Linnaeus, 1758)
Pseudoterpna coronillaria (Hübner, 1817)
Pseudoterpna pruinata (Hufnagel, 1767)
Pungeleria capreolaria (Denis & Schiffermüller, 1775)
Rhodometra sacraria (Linnaeus, 1767)
Rhodostrophia calabra (Petagna, 1786)
Rhodostrophia cretacaria Rebel, 1916
Rhodostrophia discopunctata Amsel, 1935
Rhodostrophia tabidaria (Zeller, 1847)
Rhodostrophia vibicaria (Clerck, 1759)
Rhoptria asperaria (Hübner, 1817)
Rhoptria dolosaria (Herrich-Schäffer, 1848)
Schistostege decussata (Denis & Schiffermüller, 1775)
Scopula asellaria (Herrich-Schäffer, 1847)
Scopula beckeraria (Lederer, 1853)
Scopula confinaria (Herrich-Schäffer, 1847)
Scopula flaccidaria (Zeller, 1852)
Scopula imitaria (Hübner, 1799)
Scopula immutata (Linnaeus, 1758)
Scopula incanata (Linnaeus, 1758)
Scopula luridata (Zeller, 1847)
Scopula marginepunctata (Goeze, 1781)
Scopula mentzeri Hausmann, 1993
Scopula minorata (Boisduval, 1833)
Scopula decorata (Denis & Schiffermüller, 1775)
Scopula nigropunctata (Hufnagel, 1767)
Scopula ochraceata (Staudinger, 1901)
Scopula ornata (Scopoli, 1763)
Scopula rubiginata (Hufnagel, 1767)
Scopula submutata (Treitschke, 1828)
Scopula tessellaria (Boisduval, 1840)
Scopula turbulentaria (Staudinger, 1870)
Scopula vigilata (Sohn-Rethel, 1929)
Scotopteryx bipunctaria (Denis & Schiffermüller, 1775)
Scotopteryx chenopodiata (Linnaeus, 1758)
Scotopteryx coarctaria (Denis & Schiffermüller, 1775)
Scotopteryx ignorata Huemer & Hausmann, 1998
Scotopteryx luridata (Hufnagel, 1767)
Scotopteryx moeniata (Scopoli, 1763)
Scotopteryx olympia Rezbanyai-Reser, 2003
Scotopteryx vicinaria (Duponchel, 1830)
Selenia lunularia (Hübner, 1788)
Selidosema brunnearia (de Villers, 1789)
Selidosema plumaria (Denis & Schiffermüller, 1775)
Siona lineata (Scopoli, 1763)
Stamnodes depeculata (Lederer, 1870)
Stegania dilectaria (Hübner, 1790)
Synopsia sociaria (Hübner, 1799)
Tephronia sepiaria (Hufnagel, 1767)
Thalera fimbrialis (Scopoli, 1763)
Thera britannica (Turner, 1925)
Thera cognata (Thunberg, 1792)
Thera cupressata (Geyer, 1831)
Thera variata (Denis & Schiffermüller, 1775)
Thera vetustata (Denis & Schiffermüller, 1775)
Thetidia smaragdaria (Fabricius, 1787)
Timandra comae Schmidt, 1931
Triphosa dubitata (Linnaeus, 1758)
Triphosa sabaudiata (Duponchel, 1830)
Xanthorhoe biriviata (Borkhausen, 1794)
Xanthorhoe designata (Hufnagel, 1767)
Xanthorhoe disjunctaria (de La Harpe, 1860)
Xanthorhoe fluctuata (Linnaeus, 1758)
Xanthorhoe friedrichi Viidalepp & Skou, 2004
Xanthorhoe montanata (Denis & Schiffermüller, 1775)
Xanthorhoe oxybiata (Milliere, 1872)
Xanthorhoe spadicearia (Denis & Schiffermüller, 1775)
Xenochlorodes olympiaria (Herrich-Schäffer, 1852)

Glyphipterigidae
Acrolepiopsis vesperella (Zeller, 1850)
Digitivalva eglanteriella (Mann, 1855)
Digitivalva granitella (Treitschke, 1833)
Digitivalva macedonica (Klimesch, 1956)
Digitivalva occidentella (Klimesch, 1956)
Digitivalva pulicariae (Klimesch, 1956)
Digitivalva seligeri Gaedike, 2011
Glyphipterix equitella (Scopoli, 1763)
Glyphipterix schoenicolella Boyd, 1859
Glyphipterix simpliciella (Stephens, 1834)
Glyphipterix thrasonella (Scopoli, 1763)
Orthotelia sparganella (Thunberg, 1788)

Gracillariidae
Acrocercops brongniardella (Fabricius, 1798)
Acrocercops tacita Triberti, 2001
Aspilapteryx inquinata Triberti, 1985
Aspilapteryx limosella (Duponchel, 1843)
Aspilapteryx tringipennella (Zeller, 1839)
Caloptilia alchimiella (Scopoli, 1763)
Caloptilia braccatella (Staudinger, 1870)
Caloptilia elongella (Linnaeus, 1761)
Caloptilia flava (Staudinger, 1871)
Caloptilia roscipennella (Hübner, 1796)
Calybites phasianipennella (Hübner, 1813)
Cameraria ohridella Deschka & Dimic, 1986
Cupedia cupediella (Herrich-Schäffer, 1855)
Dextellia dorsilineella (Amsel, 1935)
Dialectica scalariella (Zeller, 1850)
Dialectica soffneri (Gregor & Povolny, 1965)
Euspilapteryx auroguttella Stephens, 1835
Gracillaria syringella (Fabricius, 1794)
Metriochroa latifoliella (Milliere, 1886)
Micrurapteryx kollariella (Zeller, 1839)
Parornix acuta Triberti, 1980
Parornix anguliferella (Zeller, 1847)
Parornix carpinella (Frey, 1863)
Parornix compsumpta Triberti, 1987
Parornix finitimella (Zeller, 1850)
Parornix fragilella Triberti, 1981
Parornix oculata Triberti, 1979
Parornix scoticella (Stainton, 1850)
Parornix torquillella (Zeller, 1850)
Phyllocnistis citrella Stainton, 1856
Phyllocnistis labyrinthella (Bjerkander, 1790)
Phyllocnistis unipunctella (Stephens, 1834)
Phyllocnistis valentinensis M. Hering, 1936
Phyllonorycter abrasella (Duponchel, 1843)
Phyllonorycter anceps Triberti, 2007
Phyllonorycter belotella (Staudinger, 1859)
Phyllonorycter blancardella (Fabricius, 1781)
Phyllonorycter brunnea Deschka, 1975
Phyllonorycter cephalariae (Lhomme, 1934)
Phyllonorycter cerasicolella (Herrich-Schäffer, 1855)
Phyllonorycter christenseni Derra, 1985
Phyllonorycter corylifoliella (Hübner, 1796)
Phyllonorycter cydoniella (Denis & Schiffermüller, 1775)
Phyllonorycter delitella (Duponchel, 1843)
Phyllonorycter esperella (Goeze, 1783)
Phyllonorycter fraxinella (Zeller, 1846)
Phyllonorycter gerfriedi A. & Z. Lastuvka, 2007
Phyllonorycter graecus A. & Z. Lastuvka, 2007
Phyllonorycter helianthemella (Herrich-Schäffer, 1861)
Phyllonorycter ilicifoliella (Duponchel, 1843)
Phyllonorycter kusdasi Deschka, 1970
Phyllonorycter lapadiella (Krone, 1909)
Phyllonorycter lautella (Zeller, 1846)
Phyllonorycter leucographella (Zeller, 1850)
Phyllonorycter macedonica (Deschka, 1971)
Phyllonorycter maestingella (Muller, 1764)
Phyllonorycter messaniella (Zeller, 1846)
Phyllonorycter millierella (Staudinger, 1871)
Phyllonorycter muelleriella (Zeller, 1839)
Phyllonorycter obtusifoliella Deschka, 1974
Phyllonorycter olympica Deschka, 1983
Phyllonorycter parisiella (Wocke, 1848)
Phyllonorycter platani (Staudinger, 1870)
Phyllonorycter populifoliella (Treitschke, 1833)
Phyllonorycter quercifoliella (Zeller, 1839)
Phyllonorycter roboris (Zeller, 1839)
Phyllonorycter scitulella (Duponchel, 1843)
Phyllonorycter spinicolella (Zeller, 1846)
Phyllonorycter suberifoliella (Zeller, 1850)
Phyllonorycter sublautella (Stainton, 1869)
Phyllonorycter trifasciella (Haworth, 1828)
Phyllonorycter triflorella (Peyerimhoff, 1872)
Phyllonorycter trojana Deschka, 1982
Phyllonorycter ulicicolella (Stainton, 1851)
Povolnya leucapennella (Stephens, 1835)
Spulerina simploniella (Fischer von Röslerstamm, 1840)

Heliozelidae
Antispila treitschkiella (Fischer von Röslerstamm, 1843)
Holocacista rivillei (Stainton, 1855)

Hepialidae
Pharmacis lupulina (Linnaeus, 1758)
Triodia adriaticus (Osthelder, 1931)
Triodia amasinus (Herrich-Schäffer, 1851)
Triodia sylvina (Linnaeus, 1761)

Heterogynidae
Heterogynis penella (Hübner, 1819)

Incurvariidae
Incurvaria masculella (Denis & Schiffermüller, 1775)
Incurvaria oehlmanniella (Hübner, 1796)

Lasiocampidae
Dendrolimus pini (Linnaeus, 1758)
Eriogaster catax (Linnaeus, 1758)
Eriogaster lanestris (Linnaeus, 1758)
Eriogaster rimicola (Denis & Schiffermüller, 1775)
Euthrix potatoria (Linnaeus, 1758)
Gastropacha quercifolia (Linnaeus, 1758)
Lasiocampa quercus (Linnaeus, 1758)
Lasiocampa grandis (Rogenhofer, 1891)
Lasiocampa trifolii (Denis & Schiffermüller, 1775)
Macrothylacia rubi (Linnaeus, 1758)
Malacosoma castrensis (Linnaeus, 1758)
Malacosoma neustria (Linnaeus, 1758)
Malacosoma franconica (Denis & Schiffermüller, 1775)
Odonestis pruni (Linnaeus, 1758)
Pachypasa otus (Drury, 1773)
Phyllodesma ilicifolia (Linnaeus, 1758)
Phyllodesma tremulifolia (Hübner, 1810)
Trichiura castiliana Spuler, 1908
Trichiura crataegi (Linnaeus, 1758)
Trichiura verenae Witt, 1981

Lecithoceridae
Ceuthomadarus viduellus Rebel, 1903
Eurodachtha flavissimella (Mann, 1862)
Lecithocera nigrana (Duponchel, 1836)
Odites kollarella (O. G. Costa, 1832)

Limacodidae
Apoda limacodes (Hufnagel, 1766)
Heterogenea asella (Denis & Schiffermüller, 1775)
Hoyosia cretica (Rebel, 1906)

Lyonetiidae
Leucoptera malifoliella (O. Costa, 1836)
Leucoptera nieukerkeni Mey, 1994
Leucoptera thessalica Mey, 1994
Lyonetia clerkella (Linnaeus, 1758)
Lyonetia prunifoliella (Hübner, 1796)

Micropterigidae
Micropterix aruncella (Scopoli, 1763)
Micropterix corcyrella Walsingham, 1919
Micropterix kardamylensis Rebel, 1903
Micropterix klimeschi Heath, 1973
Micropterix lakoniensis Heath, 1985
Micropterix myrtetella Zeller, 1850
Micropterix tunbergella (Fabricius, 1787)
Micropterix wockei Staudinger, 1870

Millieridae
Millieria dolosalis (Heydenreich, 1851)

Momphidae
Mompha miscella (Denis & Schiffermüller, 1775)
Mompha conturbatella (Hübner, 1819)
Mompha epilobiella (Denis & Schiffermüller, 1775)
Mompha meridionella Koster & Sinev, 2003
Mompha ochraceella (Curtis, 1839)
Mompha subbistrigella (Haworth, 1828)
Mompha raschkiella (Zeller, 1839)

Nepticulidae
Acalyptris lesbia van Nieukerken & Hull, 2007
Acalyptris limonii Z. & A. Lastuvka, 1998
Acalyptris loranthella (Klimesch, 1937)
Acalyptris maritima A. & Z. Lastuvka, 1997
Acalyptris pistaciae van Nieukerken, 2007
Acalyptris platani (Muller-Rutz, 1934)
Ectoedemia aegilopidella (Klimesch, 1978)
Ectoedemia agrimoniae (Frey, 1858)
Ectoedemia albifasciella (Heinemann, 1871)
Ectoedemia alnifoliae van Nieukerken, 1985
Ectoedemia angulifasciella (Stainton, 1849)
Ectoedemia arcuatella (Herrich-Schäffer, 1855)
Ectoedemia argyropeza (Zeller, 1839)
Ectoedemia caradjai (Groschke, 1944)
Ectoedemia cerris (Zimmermann, 1944)
Ectoedemia contorta van Nieukerken, 1985
Ectoedemia erythrogenella (de Joannis, 1908)
Ectoedemia gilvipennella (Klimesch, 1946)
Ectoedemia haraldi (Soffner, 1942)
Ectoedemia heringella (Mariani, 1939)
Ectoedemia heringi (Toll, 1934)
Ectoedemia klimeschi (Skala, 1933)
Ectoedemia mahalebella (Klimesch, 1936)
Ectoedemia preisseckeri (Klimesch, 1941)
Ectoedemia pseudoilicis Z. & A. Lastuvka, 1998
Ectoedemia quinquella (Bedell, 1848)
Ectoedemia rufifrontella (Caradja, 1920)
Ectoedemia spinosella (de Joannis, 1908)
Ectoedemia subbimaculella (Haworth, 1828)
Ectoedemia terebinthivora (Klimesch, 1975)
Ectoedemia decentella (Herrich-Schäffer, 1855)
Ectoedemia aegaeica Z. & A. Lastuvka & Johansson, 1998
Ectoedemia deschkai (Klimesch, 1978)
Ectoedemia empetrifolii A. & Z. Lastuvka, 2000
Ectoedemia eriki A. & Z. Lastuvka, 2000
Ectoedemia euphorbiella (Stainton, 1869)
Ectoedemia groschkei (Skala, 1943)
Ectoedemia septembrella (Stainton, 1849)
Ectoedemia amani Svensson, 1966
Ectoedemia atrifrontella (Stainton, 1851)
Ectoedemia liebwerdella Zimmermann, 1940
Ectoedemia longicaudella Klimesch, 1953
Ectoedemia monemvasiae van Nieukerken, 1985
Ectoedemia reichli Z. & A. Lastuvka, 1998
Parafomoria pseudocistivora van Nieukerken, 1983
Simplimorpha promissa (Staudinger, 1871)
Stigmella aceris (Frey, 1857)
Stigmella amygdali (Klimesch, 1978)
Stigmella atricapitella (Haworth, 1828)
Stigmella aurella (Fabricius, 1775)
Stigmella auromarginella (Richardson, 1890)
Stigmella azaroli (Klimesch, 1978)
Stigmella basiguttella (Heinemann, 1862)
Stigmella cocciferae van Nieukerken & Johansson, 2003
Stigmella dorsiguttella (Johansson, 1971)
Stigmella eberhardi (Johansson, 1971)
Stigmella fasciata van Nieukerken & Johansson, 2003
Stigmella filipendulae (Wocke, 1871)
Stigmella freyella (Heyden, 1858)
Stigmella hemargyrella (Kollar, 1832)
Stigmella hybnerella (Hübner, 1796)
Stigmella incognitella (Herrich-Schäffer, 1855)
Stigmella irregularis Puplesis, 1994
Stigmella johanssonella A. & Z. Lastuvka, 1997
Stigmella lemniscella (Zeller, 1839)
Stigmella macrolepidella (Klimesch, 1978)
Stigmella malella (Stainton, 1854)
Stigmella microtheriella (Stainton, 1854)
Stigmella minusculella (Herrich-Schäffer, 1855)
Stigmella muricatella (Klimesch, 1978)
Stigmella nivenburgensis (Preissecker, 1942)
Stigmella paliurella Gerasimov, 1937
Stigmella paradoxa (Frey, 1858)
Stigmella perpygmaeella (Doubleday, 1859)
Stigmella plagicolella (Stainton, 1854)
Stigmella prunetorum (Stainton, 1855)
Stigmella pyrellicola (Klimesch, 1978)
Stigmella rhamnophila (Amsel, 1934)
Stigmella roborella (Johansson, 1971)
Stigmella rolandi van Nieukerken, 1990
Stigmella ruficapitella (Haworth, 1828)
Stigmella samiatella (Zeller, 1839)
Stigmella sorbi (Stainton, 1861)
Stigmella speciosa (Frey, 1858)
Stigmella styracicolella (Klimesch, 1978)
Stigmella svenssoni (Johansson, 1971)
Stigmella szoecsiella (Borkowski, 1972)
Stigmella tityrella (Stainton, 1854)
Stigmella trimaculella (Haworth, 1828)
Stigmella trojana Z. & A. Lastuvka, 1998
Stigmella ulmiphaga (Preissecker, 1942)
Stigmella viscerella (Stainton, 1853)
Stigmella zangherii (Klimesch, 1951)
Trifurcula albiflorella Klimesch, 1978
Trifurcula bleonella (Chrétien, 1904)
Trifurcula headleyella (Stainton, 1854)
Trifurcula helladica Z. & A. Lastuvka, 2007
Trifurcula kalavritana Z. & A. Lastuvka, 1998
Trifurcula melanoptera van Nieukerken & Puplesis, 1991
Trifurcula saturejae (Parenti, 1963)
Trifurcula trilobella Klimesch, 1978
Trifurcula cryptella (Stainton, 1856)
Trifurcula eurema (Tutt, 1899)
Trifurcula manygoza van Nieukerken, A. & Z. Lastuvka, 2007
Trifurcula peloponnesica van Nieukerken, 2007
Trifurcula aurella Rebel, 1933
Trifurcula austriaca van Nieukerken, 1990
Trifurcula calycotomella A. & Z. Lastuvka, 1997
Trifurcula graeca Z. & A. Lastuvka, 1998
Trifurcula josefklimeschi van Nieukerken, 1990
Trifurcula orientella Klimesch, 1953
Trifurcula pallidella (Duponchel, 1843)
Trifurcula subnitidella (Duponchel, 1843)

Noctuidae
Abrostola agnorista Dufay, 1956
Abrostola asclepiadis (Denis & Schiffermüller, 1775)
Abrostola tripartita (Hufnagel, 1766)
Abrostola triplasia (Linnaeus, 1758)
Acontia lucida (Hufnagel, 1766)
Acontia trabealis (Scopoli, 1763)
Acontia melanura (Tauscher, 1809)
Acontiola lascivalis (Lederer, 1855)
Acontiola moldavicola (Herrich-Schäffer, 1851)
Acronicta aceris (Linnaeus, 1758)
Acronicta strigosa (Denis & Schiffermüller, 1775)
Acronicta cuspis (Hübner, 1813)
Acronicta psi (Linnaeus, 1758)
Acronicta tridens (Denis & Schiffermüller, 1775)
Acronicta auricoma (Denis & Schiffermüller, 1775)
Acronicta euphorbiae (Denis & Schiffermüller, 1775)
Acronicta orientalis (Mann, 1862)
Acronicta rumicis (Linnaeus, 1758)
Actebia fugax (Treitschke, 1825)
Actinotia polyodon (Clerck, 1759)
Actinotia radiosa (Esper, 1804)
Aedia funesta (Esper, 1786)
Aedia leucomelas (Linnaeus, 1758)
Aegle agatha (Staudinger, 1861)
Aegle kaekeritziana (Hübner, 1799)
Aegle pallida (Staudinger, 1892)
Aegle semicana (Esper, 1798)
Agrochola lychnidis (Denis & Schiffermüller, 1775)
Agrochola lactiflora Draudt, 1934
Agrochola deleta (Staudinger, 1882)
Agrochola gratiosa (Staudinger, 1882)
Agrochola helvola (Linnaeus, 1758)
Agrochola humilis (Denis & Schiffermüller, 1775)
Agrochola kindermannii (Fischer v. Röslerstamm, 1837)
Agrochola litura (Linnaeus, 1758)
Agrochola luteogrisea (Warren, 1911)
Agrochola nitida (Denis & Schiffermüller, 1775)
Agrochola osthelderi Boursin, 1951
Agrochola rupicapra (Staudinger, 1879)
Agrochola thurneri Boursin, 1953
Agrochola mansueta (Herrich-Schäffer, 1850)
Agrochola lota (Clerck, 1759)
Agrochola macilenta (Hübner, 1809)
Agrochola schreieri Hacker & Weigert, 1986
Agrochola laevis (Hübner, 1803)
Agrochola circellaris (Hufnagel, 1766)
Agrotis bigramma (Esper, 1790)
Agrotis catalaunensis (Milliere, 1873)
Agrotis cinerea (Denis & Schiffermüller, 1775)
Agrotis clavis (Hufnagel, 1766)
Agrotis endogaea Boisduval, 1834
Agrotis exclamationis (Linnaeus, 1758)
Agrotis haifae Staudinger, 1897
Agrotis herzogi Rebel, 1911
Agrotis ipsilon (Hufnagel, 1766)
Agrotis puta (Hübner, 1803)
Agrotis segetum (Denis & Schiffermüller, 1775)
Agrotis spinifera (Hübner, 1808)
Agrotis trux (Hübner, 1824)
Agrotis vestigialis (Hufnagel, 1766)
Allophyes asiatica (Staudinger, 1892)
Allophyes cretica Pinker & Reisser, 1978
Allophyes oxyacanthae (Linnaeus, 1758)
Amephana dalmatica (Rebel, 1919)
Ammoconia caecimacula (Denis & Schiffermüller, 1775)
Ammoconia reisseri L. Ronkay & Varga, 1984
Ammoconia senex (Geyer, 1828)
Amphipoea fucosa (Freyer, 1830)
Amphipoea oculea (Linnaeus, 1761)
Amphipyra berbera Rungs, 1949
Amphipyra effusa Boisduval, 1828
Amphipyra livida (Denis & Schiffermüller, 1775)
Amphipyra micans Lederer, 1857
Amphipyra pyramidea (Linnaeus, 1758)
Amphipyra stix Herrich-Schäffer, 1850
Amphipyra tetra (Fabricius, 1787)
Amphipyra tragopoginis (Clerck, 1759)
Amphipyra cinnamomea (Goeze, 1781)
Anaplectoides prasina (Denis & Schiffermüller, 1775)
Anarta mendax (Staudinger, 1879)
Anarta odontites (Boisduval, 1829)
Anarta stigmosa (Christoph, 1887)
Anarta trifolii (Hufnagel, 1766)
Anthracia eriopoda (Herrich-Schäffer, 1851)
Antitype chi (Linnaeus, 1758)
Antitype jonis (Lederer, 1865)
Antitype suda (Geyer, 1832)
Apamea anceps (Denis & Schiffermüller, 1775)
Apamea aquila Donzel, 1837
Apamea baischi Hacker, 1989
Apamea crenata (Hufnagel, 1766)
Apamea epomidion (Haworth, 1809)
Apamea furva (Denis & Schiffermüller, 1775)
Apamea illyria Freyer, 1846
Apamea lateritia (Hufnagel, 1766)
Apamea lithoxylaea (Denis & Schiffermüller, 1775)
Apamea maillardi (Geyer, 1834)
Apamea michielii Varga, 1976
Apamea minoica (Fibiger, Ronkay, Schmidt & Zilli, 2005)
Apamea monoglypha (Hufnagel, 1766)
Apamea platinea (Treitschke, 1825)
Apamea remissa (Hübner, 1809)
Apamea sicula (Turati, 1909)
Apamea sordens (Hufnagel, 1766)
Apamea syriaca (Osthelder, 1933)
Apamea unanimis (Hübner, 1813)
Apamea zeta (Treitschke, 1825)
Apaustis rupicola (Denis & Schiffermüller, 1775)
Aporophyla australis (Boisduval, 1829)
Aporophyla canescens (Duponchel, 1826)
Aporophyla chioleuca (Herrich-Schäffer, 1850)
Aporophyla lutulenta (Denis & Schiffermüller, 1775)
Aporophyla nigra (Haworth, 1809)
Apterogenum ypsillon (Denis & Schiffermüller, 1775)
Archanara dissoluta (Treitschke, 1825)
Asteroscopus sphinx (Hufnagel, 1766)
Asteroscopus syriaca (Warren, 1910)
Atethmia ambusta (Denis & Schiffermüller, 1775)
Atethmia centrago (Haworth, 1809)
Athetis hospes (Freyer, 1831)
Atypha pulmonaris (Esper, 1790)
Auchmis detersa (Esper, 1787)
Autographa gamma (Linnaeus, 1758)
Autographa jota (Linnaeus, 1758)
Axylia putris (Linnaeus, 1761)
Behounekia freyeri (Frivaldszky, 1835)
Brachylomia viminalis (Fabricius, 1776)
Brithys crini (Fabricius, 1775)
Bryophila ereptricula Treitschke, 1825
Bryophila gea (Schawerda, 1934)
Bryophila raptricula (Denis & Schiffermüller, 1775)
Bryophila rectilinea (Warren, 1909)
Bryophila seladona Christoph, 1885
Bryophila tephrocharis (Boursin, 1953)
Bryophila domestica (Hufnagel, 1766)
Bryophila strobinoi (Dujardin, 1972)
Bryophila petrea Guenée, 1852
Bryophila maeonis Lederer, 1865
Calamia tridens (Hufnagel, 1766)
Calliergis ramosa (Esper, 1786)
Callopistria juventina (Stoll, 1782)
Callopistria latreillei (Duponchel, 1827)
Calophasia barthae Wagner, 1929
Calophasia lunula (Hufnagel, 1766)
Calophasia opalina (Esper, 1793)
Calophasia platyptera (Esper, 1788)
Caradrina syriaca Staudinger, 1892
Caradrina agrotina Staudinger, 1892
Caradrina morpheus (Hufnagel, 1766)
Caradrina draudti (Boursin, 1936)
Caradrina flava Oberthur, 1876
Caradrina gilva (Donzel, 1837)
Caradrina pertinax Staudinger, 1879
Caradrina zernyi (Boursin, 1939)
Caradrina clavipalpis Scopoli, 1763
Caradrina flavirena Guenée, 1852
Caradrina levantina Hacker, 2004
Caradrina minoica Hacker, 2004
Caradrina selini Boisduval, 1840
Caradrina suscianja (Mentzer, 1981)
Caradrina wullschlegeli Pungeler, 1903
Caradrina aspersa Rambur, 1834
Caradrina kadenii Freyer, 1836
Caradrina montana Bremer, 1861
Cardepia hartigi Parenzan, 1981
Cardepia sociabilis (de Graslin, 1850)
Ceramica pisi (Linnaeus, 1758)
Cerapteryx graminis (Linnaeus, 1758)
Cerastis rubricosa (Denis & Schiffermüller, 1775)
Charanyca trigrammica (Hufnagel, 1766)
Charanyca apfelbecki (Rebel, 1901)
Charanyca ferruginea (Esper, 1785)
Chersotis anatolica (Draudt, 1936)
Chersotis andereggii (Boisduval, 1832)
Chersotis capnistis (Lederer, 1872)
Chersotis cuprea (Denis & Schiffermüller, 1775)
Chersotis elegans (Eversmann, 1837)
Chersotis fimbriola (Esper, 1803)
Chersotis laeta (Rebel, 1904)
Chersotis larixia (Guenée, 1852)
Chersotis margaritacea (Villers, 1789)
Chersotis multangula (Hübner, 1803)
Chersotis obnubila (Corti, 1926)
Chersotis rectangula (Denis & Schiffermüller, 1775)
Chersotis zukowskyi (Draudt, 1936)
Chilodes maritima (Tauscher, 1806)
Chloantha hyperici (Denis & Schiffermüller, 1775)
Chrysodeixis chalcites (Esper, 1789)
Cleoceris scoriacea (Esper, 1789)
Cleonymia opposita (Lederer, 1870)
Colocasia coryli (Linnaeus, 1758)
Condica viscosa (Freyer, 1831)
Conisania renati (Oberthur, 1890)
Conisania luteago (Denis & Schiffermüller, 1775)
Conistra ligula (Esper, 1791)
Conistra rubiginosa (Scopoli, 1763)
Conistra vaccinii (Linnaeus, 1761)
Conistra veronicae (Hübner, 1813)
Conistra erythrocephala (Denis & Schiffermüller, 1775)
Conistra rubiginea (Denis & Schiffermüller, 1775)
Conistra ragusae (Failla-Tedaldi, 1890)
Conistra torrida (Lederer, 1857)
Cornutiplusia circumflexa (Linnaeus, 1767)
Cosmia trapezina (Linnaeus, 1758)
Cosmia diffinis (Linnaeus, 1767)
Cosmia pyralina (Denis & Schiffermüller, 1775)
Cosmia confinis Herrich-Schäffer, 1849
Cosmia affinis (Linnaeus, 1767)
Craniophora ligustri (Denis & Schiffermüller, 1775)
Cryphia amygdalina Boursin, 1963
Cryphia omalosi Svendsen & Fibiger, 1998
Cryphia receptricula (Hübner, 1803)
Cryphia algae (Fabricius, 1775)
Cryphia electra Fibiger, Steiner, & Ronkay, 2009
Cryphia ochsi (Boursin, 1940)
Ctenoplusia accentifera (Lefebvre, 1827)
Cucullia celsiae Herrich-Schäffer, 1850
Cucullia calendulae Treitschke, 1835
Cucullia chamomillae (Denis & Schiffermüller, 1775)
Cucullia formosa Rogenhofer, 1860
Cucullia lactucae (Denis & Schiffermüller, 1775)
Cucullia santolinae Rambur, 1834
Cucullia santonici (Hübner, 1813)
Cucullia syrtana Mabille, 1888
Cucullia umbratica (Linnaeus, 1758)
Cucullia blattariae (Esper, 1790)
Cucullia lanceolata (Villers, 1789)
Cucullia lychnitis Rambur, 1833
Cucullia scrophulariae (Denis & Schiffermüller, 1775)
Cucullia verbasci (Linnaeus, 1758)
Dasypolia esseri Fibiger, 1993
Dasypolia templi (Thunberg, 1792)
Deltote bankiana (Fabricius, 1775)
Deltote pygarga (Hufnagel, 1766)
Denticucullus pygmina (Haworth, 1809)
Diachrysia chrysitis (Linnaeus, 1758)
Diachrysia chryson (Esper, 1789)
Diachrysia nadeja (Oberthur, 1880)
Diarsia mendica (Fabricius, 1775)
Dichagyris flammatra (Denis & Schiffermüller, 1775)
Dichagyris musiva (Hübner, 1803)
Dichagyris candelisequa (Denis & Schiffermüller, 1775)
Dichagyris celsicola (Bellier, 1859)
Dichagyris erubescens (Staudinger, 1892)
Dichagyris flavina (Herrich-Schäffer, 1852)
Dichagyris forcipula (Denis & Schiffermüller, 1775)
Dichagyris forficula (Eversmann, 1851)
Dichagyris gracilis (Wagner, 1929)
Dichagyris insula (Fibiger, 1997)
Dichagyris melanura (Kollar, 1846)
Dichagyris nigrescens (Hofner, 1888)
Dichagyris renigera (Hübner, 1808)
Dichagyris rhadamanthys (Reisser, 1958)
Dichagyris signifera (Denis & Schiffermüller, 1775)
Dichagyris soror (Fibiger, 1997)
Dichonia aeruginea (Hübner, 1808)
Dichonia convergens (Denis & Schiffermüller, 1775)
Dicycla oo (Linnaeus, 1758)
Diloba caeruleocephala (Linnaeus, 1758)
Dioszeghyana schmidti (Dioszeghy, 1935)
Divaena haywardi (Tams, 1926)
Dryobota labecula (Esper, 1788)
Dryobotodes tenebrosa (Esper, 1789)
Dryobotodes carbonis Wagner, 1931
Dryobotodes eremita (Fabricius, 1775)
Dryobotodes monochroma (Esper, 1790)
Dryobotodes servadeii Parenzan, 1982
Dypterygia scabriuscula (Linnaeus, 1758)
Egira anatolica (M. Hering, 1933)
Egira conspicillaris (Linnaeus, 1758)
Egira tibori Hreblay, 1994
Elaphria venustula (Hübner, 1790)
Enterpia laudeti (Boisduval, 1840)
Epilecta linogrisea (Denis & Schiffermüller, 1775)
Epimecia ustula (Freyer, 1835)
Epipsilia cervantes (Reisser, 1935)
Epipsilia grisescens (Fabricius, 1794)
Episema glaucina (Esper, 1789)
Episema gozmanyi L. Ronkay & Hacker, 1985
Episema korsakovi (Christoph, 1885)
Episema tersa (Denis & Schiffermüller, 1775)
Eremobia ochroleuca (Denis & Schiffermüller, 1775)
Eremohadena chenopodiphaga (Rambur, 1832)
Eucarta amethystina (Hübner, 1803)
Euchalcia chlorocharis (Dufay, 1961)
Euchalcia emichi (Rogenhofer & Mann, 1873)
Euchalcia siderifera (Eversmann, 1846)
Eugnorisma depuncta (Linnaeus, 1761)
Eugnorisma pontica (Staudinger, 1892)
Euplexia lucipara (Linnaeus, 1758)
Eupsilia transversa (Hufnagel, 1766)
Euxoa penelope Fibiger, 1997
Euxoa aquilina (Denis & Schiffermüller, 1775)
Euxoa conspicua (Hübner, 1824)
Euxoa cos (Hübner, 1824)
Euxoa decora (Denis & Schiffermüller, 1775)
Euxoa distinguenda (Lederer, 1857)
Euxoa eruta (Hübner, 1817)
Euxoa glabella Wagner, 1930
Euxoa hastifera (Donzel, 1847)
Euxoa malickyi Varga, 1990
Euxoa montivaga Fibiger, 1997
Euxoa nigricans (Linnaeus, 1761)
Euxoa obelisca (Denis & Schiffermüller, 1775)
Euxoa pareruta Fibiger, Gyulai, Zilli, Yela & Ronkay, 2010
Euxoa segnilis (Duponchel, 1837)
Euxoa temera (Hübner, 1808)
Euxoa vitta (Esper, 1789)
Euxoa derrae Hacker, 1985
Evisa schawerdae Reisser, 1930
Globia sparganii (Esper, 1790)
Gortyna flavago (Denis & Schiffermüller, 1775)
Gortyna moesiaca Herrich-Schäffer, 1849
Gortyna xanthenes Germar, 1842
Griposia aprilina (Linnaeus, 1758)
Griposia pinkeri Kobes, 1973
Griposia wegneri Kobes & Fibiger, 2003
Hada plebeja (Linnaeus, 1761)
Hadena perplexa (Denis & Schiffermüller, 1775)
Hadena silenes (Hübner, 1822)
Hadena syriaca (Osthelder, 1933)
Hadena adriana (Schawerda, 1921)
Hadena albimacula (Borkhausen, 1792)
Hadena caesia (Denis & Schiffermüller, 1775)
Hadena capsincola (Denis & Schiffermüller, 1775)
Hadena clara (Staudinger, 1901)
Hadena compta (Denis & Schiffermüller, 1775)
Hadena confusa (Hufnagel, 1766)
Hadena drenowskii (Rebel, 1930)
Hadena filograna (Esper, 1788)
Hadena gueneei (Staudinger, 1901)
Hadena luteocincta (Rambur, 1834)
Hadena magnolii (Boisduval, 1829)
Hadena persimilis Hacker, 1996
Hadena vulcanica (Turati, 1907)
Hadena wehrlii (Draudt, 1934)
Hadena pumila (Staudinger, 1879)
Hadena tephroleuca (Boisduval, 1833)
Haemerosia renalis (Hübner, 1813)
Haemerosia vassilininei A. Bang-Haas, 1912
Hecatera bicolorata (Hufnagel, 1766)
Hecatera cappa (Hübner, 1809)
Hecatera dysodea (Denis & Schiffermüller, 1775)
Helicoverpa armigera (Hübner, 1808)
Heliothis adaucta Butler, 1878
Heliothis incarnata Freyer, 1838
Heliothis maritima Graslin, 1855
Heliothis nubigera Herrich-Schäffer, 1851
Heliothis peltigera (Denis & Schiffermüller, 1775)
Heliothis viriplaca (Hufnagel, 1766)
Helivictoria victorina (Sodoffsky, 1849)
Helotropha leucostigma (Hübner, 1808)
Heterophysa dumetorum (Geyer, 1834)
Hoplodrina ambigua (Denis & Schiffermüller, 1775)
Hoplodrina blanda (Denis & Schiffermüller, 1775)
Hoplodrina octogenaria (Goeze, 1781)
Hoplodrina respersa (Denis & Schiffermüller, 1775)
Hoplodrina superstes (Ochsenheimer, 1816)
Janthinea friwaldskii (Duponchel, 1835)
Jodia croceago (Denis & Schiffermüller, 1775)
Lacanobia contigua (Denis & Schiffermüller, 1775)
Lacanobia suasa (Denis & Schiffermüller, 1775)
Lacanobia blenna (Hübner, 1824)
Lacanobia oleracea (Linnaeus, 1758)
Lacanobia splendens (Hübner, 1808)
Lacanobia w-latinum (Hufnagel, 1766)
Lamprosticta culta (Denis & Schiffermüller, 1775)
Lasionycta proxima (Hübner, 1809)
Lenisa geminipuncta (Haworth, 1809)
Leucania loreyi (Duponchel, 1827)
Leucania comma (Linnaeus, 1761)
Leucania herrichi Herrich-Schäffer, 1849
Leucania obsoleta (Hübner, 1803)
Leucania palaestinae Staudinger, 1897
Leucania punctosa (Treitschke, 1825)
Leucania putrescens (Hübner, 1824)
Leucania zeae (Duponchel, 1827)
Leucochlaena muscosa (Staudinger, 1892)
Lithophane ledereri (Staudinger, 1892)
Lithophane merckii (Rambur, 1832)
Lithophane ornitopus (Hufnagel, 1766)
Lithophane semibrunnea (Haworth, 1809)
Lithophane socia (Hufnagel, 1766)
Lithophane lapidea (Hübner, 1808)
Litoligia literosa (Haworth, 1809)
Lophoterges hoerhammeri (Wagner, 1931)
Luperina dumerilii (Duponchel, 1826)
Luperina rubella (Duponchel, 1835)
Lycophotia porphyrea (Denis & Schiffermüller, 1775)
Macdunnoughia confusa (Stephens, 1850)
Mamestra brassicae (Linnaeus, 1758)
Maraschia grisescens Osthelder, 1933
Megalodes eximia (Freyer, 1845)
Meganephria bimaculosa (Linnaeus, 1767)
Mesapamea secalella Remm, 1983
Mesapamea secalis (Linnaeus, 1758)
Mesogona acetosellae (Denis & Schiffermüller, 1775)
Mesogona oxalina (Hübner, 1803)
Mesoligia furuncula (Denis & Schiffermüller, 1775)
Mniotype adusta (Esper, 1790)
Mniotype satura (Denis & Schiffermüller, 1775)
Mniotype solieri (Boisduval, 1829)
Mormo maura (Linnaeus, 1758)
Mythimna riparia (Rambur, 1829)
Mythimna albipuncta (Denis & Schiffermüller, 1775)
Mythimna congrua (Hübner, 1817)
Mythimna ferrago (Fabricius, 1787)
Mythimna l-album (Linnaeus, 1767)
Mythimna umbrigera (Saalmuller, 1891)
Mythimna languida (Walker, 1858)
Mythimna conigera (Denis & Schiffermüller, 1775)
Mythimna impura (Hübner, 1808)
Mythimna pallens (Linnaeus, 1758)
Mythimna straminea (Treitschke, 1825)
Mythimna turca (Linnaeus, 1761)
Mythimna vitellina (Hübner, 1808)
Mythimna prominens (Walker, 1856)
Mythimna unipuncta (Haworth, 1809)
Mythimna alopecuri (Boisduval, 1840)
Mythimna andereggii (Boisduval, 1840)
Mythimna sicula (Treitschke, 1835)
Naenia typica (Linnaeus, 1758)
Noctua comes Hübner, 1813
Noctua fimbriata (Schreber, 1759)
Noctua interjecta Hübner, 1803
Noctua interposita (Hübner, 1790)
Noctua janthina Denis & Schiffermüller, 1775
Noctua orbona (Hufnagel, 1766)
Noctua pronuba (Linnaeus, 1758)
Noctua tertia Mentzer & al., 1991
Noctua tirrenica Biebinger, Speidel & Hanigk, 1983
Nonagria typhae (Thunberg, 1784)
Nyctobrya amasina Draudt, 1931
Ochropleura leucogaster (Freyer, 1831)
Ochropleura plecta (Linnaeus, 1761)
Oligia latruncula (Denis & Schiffermüller, 1775)
Oligia strigilis (Linnaeus, 1758)
Olivenebula subsericata (Herrich-Schäffer, 1861)
Omphalophana anatolica (Lederer, 1857)
Omphalophana antirrhinii (Hübner, 1803)
Opigena polygona (Denis & Schiffermüller, 1775)
Oria musculosa (Hübner, 1808)
Orthosia cerasi (Fabricius, 1775)
Orthosia cruda (Denis & Schiffermüller, 1775)
Orthosia dalmatica (Wagner, 1909)
Orthosia miniosa (Denis & Schiffermüller, 1775)
Orthosia incerta (Hufnagel, 1766)
Orthosia gothica (Linnaeus, 1758)
Oxytripia orbiculosa (Esper, 1799)
Pachetra sagittigera (Hufnagel, 1766)
Pamparama acuta (Freyer, 1838)
Panchrysia v-argenteum (Esper, 1798)
Panemeria tenebrata (Scopoli, 1763)
Panemeria tenebromorpha Rakosy, Hentscholek & Huber, 1996
Panolis flammea (Denis & Schiffermüller, 1775)
Panthea coenobita (Esper, 1785)
Paranataelia whitei (Rebel, 1906)
Peridroma saucia (Hübner, 1808)
Perigrapha i-cinctum (Denis & Schiffermüller, 1775)
Perigrapha rorida Frivaldszky, 1835
Perigrapha sellingi Fibiger, Hacker & Moberg, 1996
Periphanes delphinii (Linnaeus, 1758)
Philareta treitschkei (Frivaldszky, 1835)
Phlogophora meticulosa (Linnaeus, 1758)
Phlogophora scita (Hübner, 1790)
Photedes fluxa (Hübner, 1809)
Photedes morrisii (Dale, 1837)
Phyllophila obliterata (Rambur, 1833)
Plusia festucae (Linnaeus, 1758)
Polia bombycina (Hufnagel, 1766)
Polia serratilinea Ochsenheimer, 1816
Polymixis bischoffii (Herrich-Schäffer, 1850)
Polymixis culoti (Schawerda, 1921)
Polymixis leuconota (Frivaldszky, 1841)
Polymixis manisadijani (Staudinger, 1881)
Polymixis polymita (Linnaeus, 1761)
Polymixis rufocincta (Geyer, 1828)
Polymixis serpentina (Treitschke, 1825)
Polyphaenis sericata (Esper, 1787)
Praestilbia armeniaca Staudinger, 1892
Protoschinia scutosa (Denis & Schiffermüller, 1775)
Pseudozarba bipartita (Herrich-Schäffer, 1850)
Pyrrhia purpura (Hübner, 1817)
Pyrrhia umbra (Hufnagel, 1766)
Pyrrhia victorina (Sodoffsky, 1849)
Rhizedra lutosa (Hübner, 1803)
Rhyacia arenacea (Hampson, 1907)
Rhyacia helvetina (Boisduval, 1833)
Rhyacia lucipeta (Denis & Schiffermüller, 1775)
Rhyacia nyctymerides (O. Bang-Haas, 1922)
Rhyacia simulans (Hufnagel, 1766)
Rileyiana fovea (Treitschke, 1825)
Schinia cognata (Freyer, 1833)
Scotochrosta pulla (Denis & Schiffermüller, 1775)
Sesamia cretica Lederer, 1857
Sesamia nonagrioides Lefebvre, 1827
Sideridis implexa (Hübner, 1809)
Sideridis reticulata (Goeze, 1781)
Sideridis lampra (Schawerda, 1913)
Simyra albovenosa (Goeze, 1781)
Simyra dentinosa Freyer, 1838
Simyra nervosa (Denis & Schiffermüller, 1775)
Spaelotis ravida (Denis & Schiffermüller, 1775)
Spaelotis senna (Freyer, 1829)
Spodoptera cilium Guenée, 1852
Spodoptera exigua (Hübner, 1808)
Spodoptera littoralis (Boisduval, 1833)
Standfussiana lucernea (Linnaeus, 1758)
Standfussiana nictymera (Boisduval, 1834)
Standfussiana sturanyi (Rebel, 1906)
Stilbina olympica Dierl & Povolny, 1970
Subacronicta megacephala (Denis & Schiffermüller, 1775)
Teinoptera lunaki (Boursin, 1940)
Teinoptera oliva (Staudinger, 1895)
Teinoptera olivina (Herrich-Schäffer, 1852)
Thalpophila matura (Hufnagel, 1766)
Tholera cespitis (Denis & Schiffermüller, 1775)
Tholera decimalis (Poda, 1761)
Thysanoplusia circumscripta (Freyer, 1831)
Thysanoplusia daubei (Boisduval, 1840)
Thysanoplusia orichalcea (Fabricius, 1775)
Tiliacea aurago (Denis & Schiffermüller, 1775)
Tiliacea citrago (Linnaeus, 1758)
Tiliacea cypreago (Hampson, 1906)
Tiliacea sulphurago (Denis & Schiffermüller, 1775)
Trachea atriplicis (Linnaeus, 1758)
Trichoplusia ni (Hübner, 1803)
Trigonophora flammea (Esper, 1785)
Tyta luctuosa (Denis & Schiffermüller, 1775)
Ulochlaena hirta (Hübner, 1813)
Valeria oleagina (Denis & Schiffermüller, 1775)
Xanthia gilvago (Denis & Schiffermüller, 1775)
Xanthia icteritia (Hufnagel, 1766)
Xanthia castanea Osthelder, 1933
Xanthia togata (Esper, 1788)
Xanthodes albago (Fabricius, 1794)
Xestia ashworthii (Doubleday, 1855)
Xestia c-nigrum (Linnaeus, 1758)
Xestia triangulum (Hufnagel, 1766)
Xestia baja (Denis & Schiffermüller, 1775)
Xestia castanea (Esper, 1798)
Xestia cohaesa (Herrich-Schäffer, 1849)
Xestia ochreago (Hübner, 1809)
Xestia palaestinensis (Kalchberg, 1897)
Xestia stigmatica (Hübner, 1813)
Xestia xanthographa (Denis & Schiffermüller, 1775)
Xylena exsoleta (Linnaeus, 1758)
Xylena lunifera Warren, 1910
Xylena vetusta (Hübner, 1813)

Nolidae
Bena bicolorana (Fuessly, 1775)
Earias clorana (Linnaeus, 1761)
Earias insulana (Boisduval, 1833)
Earias vernana (Fabricius, 1787)
Garella nilotica (Rogenhofer, 1882)
Meganola albula (Denis & Schiffermüller, 1775)
Meganola gigantula (Staudinger, 1879)
Meganola impura (Mann, 1862)
Meganola kolbi (Daniel, 1935)
Meganola togatulalis (Hübner, 1796)
Nola aerugula (Hübner, 1793)
Nola chlamitulalis (Hübner, 1813)
Nola confusalis (Herrich-Schäffer, 1847)
Nola cucullatella (Linnaeus, 1758)
Nola harouni (Wiltshire, 1951)
Nola squalida Staudinger, 1871
Nola subchlamydula Staudinger, 1871
Nycteola asiatica (Krulikovsky, 1904)
Nycteola columbana (Turner, 1925)
Nycteola revayana (Scopoli, 1772)
Nycteola siculana (Fuchs, 1899)
Pseudoips prasinana (Linnaeus, 1758)

Notodontidae
Cerura vinula (Linnaeus, 1758)
Clostera anachoreta (Denis & Schiffermüller, 1775)
Clostera anastomosis (Linnaeus, 1758)
Clostera curtula (Linnaeus, 1758)
Clostera pigra (Hufnagel, 1766)
Dicranura ulmi (Denis & Schiffermüller, 1775)
Drymonia dodonaea (Denis & Schiffermüller, 1775)
Drymonia querna (Denis & Schiffermüller, 1775)
Drymonia ruficornis (Hufnagel, 1766)
Drymonia velitaris (Hufnagel, 1766)
Furcula bifida (Brahm, 1787)
Furcula furcula (Clerck, 1759)
Harpyia milhauseri (Fabricius, 1775)
Notodonta torva (Hübner, 1803)
Notodonta tritophus (Denis & Schiffermüller, 1775)
Notodonta ziczac (Linnaeus, 1758)
Paradrymonia vittata (Staudinger, 1892)
Peridea korbi (Rebel, 1918)
Phalera bucephala (Linnaeus, 1758)
Phalera bucephaloides (Ochsenheimer, 1810)
Pterostoma palpina (Clerck, 1759)
Ptilodon capucina (Linnaeus, 1758)
Rhegmatophila alpina (Bellier, 1881)
Spatalia argentina (Denis & Schiffermüller, 1775)
Stauropus fagi (Linnaeus, 1758)
Thaumetopoea pityocampa (Denis & Schiffermüller, 1775)
Thaumetopoea processionea (Linnaeus, 1758)
Thaumetopoea solitaria (Freyer, 1838)

Oecophoridae
Batia lambdella (Donovan, 1793)
Batia lunaris (Haworth, 1828)
Batia lutosella Jackh, 1972
Batia samosella Sutter, 2003
Borkhausenia minutella (Linnaeus, 1758)
Crossotocera wagnerella Zerny, 1930
Dasycera imitatrix Zeller, 1847
Dasycera krueperella Staudinger, 1870
Dasycera oliviella (Fabricius, 1794)
Decantha borkhausenii (Zeller, 1839)
Denisia augustella (Hübner, 1796)
Denisia rhaetica (Frey, 1856)
Endrosis sarcitrella (Linnaeus, 1758)
Epicallima formosella (Denis & Schiffermüller, 1775)
Epicallima icterinella (Mann, 1867)
Esperia sulphurella (Fabricius, 1775)
Fabiola pokornyi (Nickerl, 1864)
Harpella forficella (Scopoli, 1763)
Holoscolia huebneri Kocak, 1980
Holoscolia majorella Rebel, 1902
Oecophora bractella (Linnaeus, 1758)
Pleurota marginella (Denis & Schiffermüller, 1775)
Pleurota arduella Rebel, 1906
Pleurota aristella (Linnaeus, 1767)
Pleurota bicostella (Clerck, 1759)
Pleurota chalepensis Rebel, 1917
Pleurota contristatella Mann, 1867
Pleurota ericella (Duponchel, 1839)
Pleurota filigerella Mann, 1867
Pleurota metricella (Zeller, 1847)
Pleurota nitens Staudinger, 1870
Pleurota planella (Staudinger, 1859)
Pleurota protasella Staudinger, 1883
Pleurota pungitiella Herrich-Schäffer, 1854
Pleurota pyropella (Denis & Schiffermüller, 1775)
Pleurota tristatella Staudinger, 1870
Pleurota vittalba Staudinger, 1871
Pleurota creticella Rebel, 1916
Schiffermuelleria schaefferella (Linnaeus, 1758)

Opostegidae
Opostega salaciella (Treitschke, 1833)
Opostega spatulella Herrich-Schäffer, 1855
Opostegoides menthinella (Mann, 1855)
Pseudopostega crepusculella (Zeller, 1839)

Peleopodidae
Carcina quercana (Fabricius, 1775)

Plutellidae
Eidophasia messingiella (Fischer von Röslerstamm, 1840)
Eidophasia syenitella Herrich-Schäffer, 1854
Plutella xylostella (Linnaeus, 1758)
Rhigognostis annulatella (Curtis, 1832)
Rhigognostis wolfschlaegeri (Rebel, 1940)

Praydidae
Prays citri (Milliere, 1873)
Prays oleae (Bernard, 1788)

Prodoxidae
Lampronia rupella (Denis & Schiffermüller, 1775)

Psychidae
Acanthopsyche ecksteini (Lederer, 1855)
Anaproutia reticulatella (Bruand, 1853)
Apterona helicinella (Herrich-Schäffer, 1846)
Apterona helicoidella (Vallot, 1827)
Bijugis bombycella (Denis & Schiffermüller, 1775)
Bijugis pectinella (Denis & Schiffermüller, 1775)
Canephora hirsuta (Poda, 1761)
Dahlica achajensis (Sieder, 1966)
Dahlica pseudoachajensis (Stengel, 1990)
Dahlica thessaliensis Weidlich, 2008
Dahlica triquetrella (Hübner, 1813)
Eochorica balcanica (Rebel, 1919)
Epichnopterix plumella (Denis & Schiffermüller, 1775)
Epichnopterix sieboldi (Reutti, 1853)
Eumasia parietariella (Heydenreich, 1851)
Heliopsychidea graecella (Milliere, 1866)
Loebelia crassicornis (Staudinger, 1870)
Luffia lapidella (Goeze, 1783)
Megalophanes viciella (Denis & Schiffermüller, 1775)
Montanima predotae Sieder, 1949
Narycia astrella (Herrich-Schäffer, 1851)
Oiketicoides febretta (Boyer de Fonscolombe, 1835)
Oiketicoides lutea (Staudinger, 1870)
Pachythelia villosella (Ochsenheimer, 1810)
Peloponnesia culminella Sieder, 1961
Peloponnesia glaphyrella (Rebel, 1906)
Peloponnesia haettenschwileri Hauser, 1996
Penestoglossa dardoinella (Milliere, 1863)
Phalacropterix praecellens (Staudinger, 1870)
Pseudobankesia arahova Stengel, 1990
Pseudobankesia darwini Stengel, 1990
Pseudobankesia hauseriella Henderickx, 1998
Psyche casta (Pallas, 1767)
Psyche crassiorella Bruand, 1851
Ptilocephala albida (Esper, 1786)
Reisseronia magna Hattenschwiler, 1982
Reisseronia malickyi Hauser, 1996
Reisseronia nigrociliella (Rebel, 1934)
Reisseronia pusilella (Rebel, 1941)
Stichobasis helicinoides (Heylaerts, 1879)
Typhonia christenseni Hattenschwiler, 1990
Typhonia ciliaris (Ochsenheimer, 1810)

Pterolonchidae
Pterolonche albescens Zeller, 1847
Pterolonche inspersa Staudinger, 1859

Pterophoridae
Adaina microdactyla (Hübner, 1813)
Agdistis adactyla (Hübner, 1819)
Agdistis bennetii (Curtis, 1833)
Agdistis bigoti Arenberger, 1976
Agdistis cypriota Arenberger, 1983
Agdistis frankeniae (Zeller, 1847)
Agdistis hartigi Arenberger, 1973
Agdistis heydeni (Zeller, 1852)
Agdistis hulli Gielis, 1998
Agdistis meridionalis (Zeller, 1847)
Agdistis paralia (Zeller, 1847)
Agdistis satanas Milliere, 1875
Agdistis tamaricis (Zeller, 1847)
Amblyptilia acanthadactyla (Hübner, 1813)
Calyciphora albodactylus (Fabricius, 1794)
Calyciphora homoiodactyla (Kasy, 1960)
Calyciphora nephelodactyla (Eversmann, 1844)
Capperia celeusi (Frey, 1886)
Capperia fusca (O. Hofmann, 1898)
Capperia hellenica Adamczewski, 1951
Capperia maratonica Adamczewski, 1951
Capperia marginellus (Zeller, 1847)
Capperia polonica Adamczewski, 1951
Capperia trichodactyla (Denis & Schiffermüller, 1775)
Capperia washbourni Adamczewski, 1951
Cnaemidophorus rhododactyla (Denis & Schiffermüller, 1775)
Crombrugghia distans (Zeller, 1847)
Crombrugghia laetus (Zeller, 1847)
Crombrugghia tristis (Zeller, 1841)
Emmelina monodactyla (Linnaeus, 1758)
Gillmeria pallidactyla (Haworth, 1811)
Hellinsia carphodactyla (Hübner, 1813)
Hellinsia distinctus (Herrich-Schäffer, 1855)
Hellinsia inulae (Zeller, 1852)
Hellinsia pectodactylus (Staudinger, 1859)
Hellinsia tephradactyla (Hübner, 1813)
Merrifieldia baliodactylus (Zeller, 1841)
Merrifieldia leucodactyla (Denis & Schiffermüller, 1775)
Merrifieldia malacodactylus (Zeller, 1847)
Merrifieldia tridactyla (Linnaeus, 1758)
Oidaematophorus lithodactyla (Treitschke, 1833)
Oxyptilus ericetorum (Stainton, 1851)
Oxyptilus parvidactyla (Haworth, 1811)
Paracapperia anatolicus (Caradja, 1920)
Platyptilia farfarellus Zeller, 1867
Platyptilia gonodactyla (Denis & Schiffermüller, 1775)
Platyptilia tesseradactyla (Linnaeus, 1761)
Procapperia linariae (Chrétien, 1922)
Pselnophorus heterodactyla (Muller, 1764)
Pterophorus ischnodactyla (Treitschke, 1835)
Pterophorus pentadactyla (Linnaeus, 1758)
Puerphorus olbiadactylus (Milliere, 1859)
Stangeia siceliota (Zeller, 1847)
Stenoptilia aridus (Zeller, 1847)
Stenoptilia bipunctidactyla (Scopoli, 1763)
Stenoptilia coprodactylus (Stainton, 1851)
Stenoptilia elkefi Arenberger, 1984
Stenoptilia lucasi Arenberger, 1990
Stenoptilia parnasia Arenberger, 1986
Stenoptilia pterodactyla (Linnaeus, 1761)
Stenoptilia stigmatodactylus (Zeller, 1852)
Stenoptilia zophodactylus (Duponchel, 1840)
Stenoptilodes taprobanes (Felder & Rogenhofer, 1875)
Wheeleria ivae (Kasy, 1960)
Wheeleria lyrae (Arenberger, 1983)
Wheeleria obsoletus (Zeller, 1841)
Wheeleria phlomidis (Staudinger, 1871)
Wheeleria spilodactylus (Curtis, 1827)

Pyralidae
Acrobasis advenella (Zincken, 1818)
Acrobasis bithynella Zeller, 1848
Acrobasis centunculella (Mann, 1859)
Acrobasis consociella (Hübner, 1813)
Acrobasis dulcella (Zeller, 1848)
Acrobasis glaucella Staudinger, 1859
Acrobasis legatea (Haworth, 1811)
Acrobasis marmorea (Haworth, 1811)
Acrobasis obliqua (Zeller, 1847)
Acrobasis obtusella (Hübner, 1796)
Acrobasis repandana (Fabricius, 1798)
Acrobasis sodalella Zeller, 1848
Acrobasis suavella (Zincken, 1818)
Acrobasis tumidana (Denis & Schiffermüller, 1775)
Aglossa asiatica Erschoff, 1872
Aglossa caprealis (Hübner, 1809)
Aglossa pinguinalis (Linnaeus, 1758)
Aglossa signicostalis Staudinger, 1871
Alophia combustella (Herrich-Schäffer, 1855)
Ancylodes pallens Ragonot, 1887
Ancylosis cinnamomella (Duponchel, 1836)
Ancylosis convexella (Lederer, 1855)
Ancylosis hellenica (Staudinger, 1871)
Ancylosis oblitella (Zeller, 1848)
Ancylosis pallida (Staudinger, 1870)
Ancylosis roscidella (Eversmann, 1844)
Ancylosis sareptalla (Herrich-Schäffer, 1861)
Aphomia sociella (Linnaeus, 1758)
Aphomia unicolor (Staudinger, 1880)
Aphomia zelleri de Joannis, 1932
Apomyelois ceratoniae (Zeller, 1839)
Apomyelois cognata (Staudinger, 1871)
Asalebria florella (Mann, 1862)
Bostra obsoletalis (Mann, 1884)
Bradyrrhoa cantenerella (Duponchel, 1837)
Bradyrrhoa confiniella Zeller, 1848
Bradyrrhoa gilveolella (Treitschke, 1832)
Cadra abstersella (Zeller, 1847)
Cadra calidella (Guenée, 1845)
Cadra cautella (Walker, 1863)
Cadra delattinella Roesler, 1965
Cadra figulilella (Gregson, 1871)
Cadra furcatella (Herrich-Schäffer, 1849)
Catastia marginea (Denis & Schiffermüller, 1775)
Corcyra cephalonica (Stainton, 1866)
Cryptoblabes gnidiella (Milliere, 1867)
Delplanqueia dilutella (Denis & Schiffermüller, 1775)
Denticera divisella (Duponchel, 1842)
Dioryctria abietella (Denis & Schiffermüller, 1775)
Dioryctria mendacella (Staudinger, 1859)
Dioryctria pineae (Staudinger, 1859)
Dioryctria resiniphila Segerer & Prose, 1997
Dioryctria sylvestrella (Ratzeburg, 1840)
Eccopisa effractella Zeller, 1848
Elegia fallax (Staudinger, 1881)
Elegia similella (Zincken, 1818)
Ematheudes punctella (Treitschke, 1833)
Endotricha flammealis (Denis & Schiffermüller, 1775)
Ephestia cypriusella (Roesler, 1965)
Ephestia disparella Hampson, 1901
Ephestia elutella (Hübner, 1796)
Ephestia kuehniella Zeller, 1879
Ephestia unicolorella Staudinger, 1881
Ephestia welseriella (Zeller, 1848)
Epidauria strigosa (Staudinger, 1879)
Epidauria transversariella (Zeller, 1848)
Epischnia adultella Zeller, 1848
Epischnia cretaciella Mann, 1869
Epischnia illotella Zeller, 1839
Epischnia leucoloma Herrich-Schäffer, 1849
Epischnia prodromella (Hübner, 1799)
Etiella zinckenella (Treitschke, 1832)
Eurhodope cirrigerella (Zincken, 1818)
Eurhodope incompta (Zeller, 1847)
Eurhodope rosella (Scopoli, 1763)
Euzophera bigella (Zeller, 1848)
Euzophera cinerosella (Zeller, 1839)
Euzophera formosella (Rebel, 1910)
Euzophera fuliginosella (Heinemann, 1865)
Euzophera lunulella (O. Costa, 1836)
Euzophera nessebarella Soffner, 1962
Euzophera osseatella (Treitschke, 1832)
Euzophera pinguis (Haworth, 1811)
Euzophera pulchella Ragonot, 1887
Euzophera umbrosella (Staudinger, 1879)
Euzopherodes lutisignella (Mann, 1869)
Euzopherodes vapidella (Mann, 1857)
Faveria dionysia (Zeller, 1846)
Galleria mellonella (Linnaeus, 1758)
Gymnancyla canella (Denis & Schiffermüller, 1775)
Gymnancyla hornigii (Lederer, 1852)
Homoeosoma nebulella (Denis & Schiffermüller, 1775)
Homoeosoma nimbella (Duponchel, 1837)
Homoeosoma sinuella (Fabricius, 1794)
Hypochalcia ahenella (Denis & Schiffermüller, 1775)
Hypochalcia lignella (Hübner, 1796)
Hypotia corticalis (Denis & Schiffermüller, 1775)
Hypsopygia costalis (Fabricius, 1775)
Hypsopygia fulvocilialis (Duponchel, 1834)
Hypsopygia glaucinalis (Linnaeus, 1758)
Hypsopygia incarnatalis (Zeller, 1847)
Hypsopygia rubidalis (Denis & Schiffermüller, 1775)
Hypsotropa limbella Zeller, 1848
Insalebria serraticornella (Zeller, 1839)
Isauria dilucidella (Duponchel, 1836)
Keradere lepidella (Ragonot, 1887)
Keradere tengstroemiella (Erschoff, 1874)
Khorassania compositella (Treitschke, 1835)
Klimeschiola philetella (Rebel, 1916)
Lamoria anella (Denis & Schiffermüller, 1775)
Lamoria ruficostella Ragonot, 1888
Loryma egregialis (Herrich-Schäffer, 1838)
Matilella fusca (Haworth, 1811)
Megasis rippertella (Zeller, 1839)
Metallosticha argyrogrammos (Zeller, 1847)
Metallostichodes nigrocyanella (Constant, 1865)
Michaeliodes friesei Roesler, 1969
Moitrelia obductella (Zeller, 1839)
Myelois circumvoluta (Fourcroy, 1785)
Myelois pluripunctella Ragonot, 1887
Neurotomia coenulentella (Zeller, 1846)
Nyctegretis lineana (Scopoli, 1786)
Nyctegretis triangulella Ragonot, 1901
Oncocera semirubella (Scopoli, 1763)
Oxybia transversella (Duponchel, 1836)
Pempelia alpigenella (Duponchel, 1836)
Pempelia amoenella (Zeller, 1848)
Pempelia johannella (Caradja, 1916)
Pempelia palumbella (Denis & Schiffermüller, 1775)
Pempeliella ornatella (Denis & Schiffermüller, 1775)
Pempeliella sororculella (Ragonot, 1887)
Pempeliella sororiella Zeller, 1839
Phycita coronatella (Guenée, 1845)
Phycita diaphana (Staudinger, 1870)
Phycita meliella (Mann, 1864)
Phycita metzneri (Zeller, 1846)
Phycita pedisignella Ragonot, 1887
Phycita poteriella (Zeller, 1846)
Phycita roborella (Denis & Schiffermüller, 1775)
Phycitodes albatella (Ragonot, 1887)
Phycitodes binaevella (Hübner, 1813)
Phycitodes inquinatella (Ragonot, 1887)
Phycitodes lacteella (Rothschild, 1915)
Phycitodes saxicola (Vaughan, 1870)
Plodia interpunctella (Hübner, 1813)
Polyocha venosa (Zeller, 1847)
Psorosa dahliella (Treitschke, 1832)
Pterothrixidia rufella (Duponchel, 1836)
Pyralis farinalis (Linnaeus, 1758)
Pyralis regalis Denis & Schiffermüller, 1775
Raphimetopus ablutella (Zeller, 1839)
Sciota hostilis (Stephens, 1834)
Sciota imperialella (Ragonot, 1887)
Selagia argyrella (Denis & Schiffermüller, 1775)
Selagia spadicella (Hübner, 1796)
Selagia subochrella (Herrich-Schäffer, 1849)
Seleucia pectinella (Chrétien, 1911)
Seleucia semirosella Ragonot, 1887
Stemmatophora brunnealis (Treitschke, 1829)
Stemmatophora combustalis (Fischer v. Röslerstamm, 1842)
Stemmatophora honestalis (Treitschke, 1829)
Synaphe moldavica (Esper, 1794)
Synaphe punctalis (Fabricius, 1775)
Synoria antiquella (Herrich-Schäffer, 1855)
Trachonitis cristella (Denis & Schiffermüller, 1775)
Tretopteryx pertusalis (Geyer, 1832)
Zophodia grossulariella (Hübner, 1809)

Saturniidae
Aglia tau (Linnaeus, 1758)
Saturnia pavoniella (Scopoli, 1763)
Saturnia spini (Denis & Schiffermüller, 1775)
Saturnia caecigena Kupido, 1825
Saturnia pyri (Denis & Schiffermüller, 1775)

Scythrididae
Enolmis desidella (Lederer, 1855)
Episcythris triangulella (Ragonot, 1874)
Scythris aerariella (Herrich-Schäffer, 1855)
Scythris albidella (Stainton, 1867)
Scythris albostriata Hannemann, 1961
Scythris ambustella Bengtsson, 1997
Scythris anomaloptera (Staudinger, 1880)
Scythris apicistrigella (Staudinger, 1870)
Scythris braschiella (O. Hofmann, 1897)
Scythris clavella (Zeller, 1855)
Scythris confluens (Staudinger, 1870)
Scythris crassiuscula (Herrich-Schäffer, 1855)
Scythris crypta Hannemann, 1961
Scythris cuspidella (Denis & Schiffermüller, 1775)
Scythris cycladeae Jackh, 1978
Scythris eberhardi Bengtsson, 1997
Scythris fallacella (Schlager, 1847)
Scythris flavilaterella (Fuchs, 1886)
Scythris fuscoaenea (Haworth, 1828)
Scythris gravatella (Zeller, 1847)
Scythris hungaricella Rebel, 1917
Scythris inclusella Lederer, 1855
Scythris inertella (Zeller, 1855)
Scythris jaeckhi Bengtsson, 1989
Scythris lafauryi Passerin d'Entreves, 1986
Scythris laminella (Denis & Schiffermüller, 1775)
Scythris limbella (Fabricius, 1775)
Scythris mus Walsingham, 1898
Scythris obscurella (Scopoli, 1763)
Scythris parnassiae Bengtsson, 1997
Scythris pascuella (Zeller, 1855)
Scythris paullella (Herrich-Schäffer, 1855)
Scythris platypyga (Staudinger, 1880)
Scythris pudorinella (Moschler, 1866)
Scythris punctivittella (O. Costa, 1836)
Scythris scopolella (Linnaeus, 1767)
Scythris seliniella (Zeller, 1839)
Scythris siccella (Zeller, 1839)
Scythris similis Hannemann, 1961
Scythris skulei Bengtsson, 1997
Scythris subaerariella (Stainton, 1867)
Scythris subschleichiella Hannemann, 1961
Scythris tabescentella (Staudinger, 1880)
Scythris tabidella (Herrich-Schäffer, 1855)
Scythris taygeticola Scholz, 1997
Scythris tenuivittella (Stainton, 1867)
Scythris tergestinella (Zeller, 1855)
Scythris tributella (Zeller, 1847)
Scythris vittella (O. Costa, 1834)

Sesiidae
Bembecia albanensis (Rebel, 1918)
Bembecia blanka Spatenka, 2001
Bembecia fokidensis Tosevski, 1991
Bembecia ichneumoniformis (Denis & Schiffermüller, 1775)
Bembecia lomatiaeformis (Lederer, 1853)
Bembecia megillaeformis (Hübner, 1813)
Bembecia pavicevici Tosevski, 1989
Bembecia priesneri Kallies, Petersen & Riefenstahl, 1998
Bembecia puella Z. Lastuvka, 1989
Bembecia sanguinolenta (Lederer, 1853)
Bembecia scopigera (Scopoli, 1763)
Bembecia uroceriformis (Treitschke, 1834)
Chamaesphecia aerifrons (Zeller, 1847)
Chamaesphecia albiventris (Lederer, 1853)
Chamaesphecia alysoniformis (Herrich-Schäffer, 1846)
Chamaesphecia anatolica Schwingenschuss, 1938
Chamaesphecia annellata (Zeller, 1847)
Chamaesphecia astatiformis (Herrich-Schäffer, 1846)
Chamaesphecia bibioniformis (Esper, 1800)
Chamaesphecia chalciformis (Esper, 1804)
Chamaesphecia doleriformis (Herrich-Schäffer, 1846)
Chamaesphecia dumonti Le Cerf, 1922
Chamaesphecia empiformis (Esper, 1783)
Chamaesphecia gorbunovi Spatenka, 1992
Chamaesphecia masariformis (Ochsenheimer, 1808)
Chamaesphecia minoica Bartsch & Puhringer, 2005
Chamaesphecia nigrifrons (Le Cerf, 1911)
Chamaesphecia proximata (Staudinger, 1891)
Chamaesphecia schmidtiiformis (Freyer, 1836)
Chamaesphecia tenthrediniformis (Denis & Schiffermüller, 1775)
Chamaesphecia thracica Z. Lastuvka, 1983
Osminia fenusaeformis (Herrich-Schäffer, 1852)
Paranthrene insolitus Le Cerf, 1914
Paranthrene tabaniformis (Rottemburg, 1775)
Pennisetia bohemica Kralicek & Povolny, 1974
Pennisetia hylaeiformis (Laspeyres, 1801)
Pyropteron affinis (Staudinger, 1856)
Pyropteron leucomelaena (Zeller, 1847)
Pyropteron minianiformis (Freyer, 1843)
Pyropteron muscaeformis (Esper, 1783)
Pyropteron triannuliformis (Freyer, 1843)
Pyropteron umbrifera (Staudinger, 1870)
Sesia apiformis (Clerck, 1759)
Sesia pimplaeformis Oberthur, 1872
Synanthedon andrenaeformis (Laspeyres, 1801)
Synanthedon cephiformis (Ochsenheimer, 1808)
Synanthedon conopiformis (Esper, 1782)
Synanthedon culiciformis (Linnaeus, 1758)
Synanthedon formicaeformis (Esper, 1783)
Synanthedon geranii Kallies, 1997
Synanthedon loranthi (Kralicek, 1966)
Synanthedon mesiaeformis (Herrich-Schäffer, 1846)
Synanthedon myopaeformis (Borkhausen, 1789)
Synanthedon rubiana Kallies, Petersen & Riefenstahl, 1998
Synanthedon spuleri (Fuchs, 1908)
Synanthedon stomoxiformis (Hübner, 1790)
Synanthedon tipuliformis (Clerck, 1759)
Synanthedon vespiformis (Linnaeus, 1761)
Tinthia brosiformis (Hübner, 1813)
Tinthia hoplisiformis (Mann, 1864)
Tinthia myrmosaeformis (Herrich-Schäffer, 1846)
Tinthia tineiformis (Esper, 1789)

Sphingidae
Acherontia atropos (Linnaeus, 1758)
Agrius convolvuli (Linnaeus, 1758)
Daphnis nerii (Linnaeus, 1758)
Deilephila elpenor (Linnaeus, 1758)
Deilephila porcellus (Linnaeus, 1758)
Dolbina elegans A. Bang-Haas, 1912
Hemaris croatica (Esper, 1800)
Hemaris fuciformis (Linnaeus, 1758)
Hemaris tityus (Linnaeus, 1758)
Hippotion celerio (Linnaeus, 1758)
Hyles cretica Eitschberger, Danner & Surholt, 1998
Hyles euphorbiae (Linnaeus, 1758)
Hyles hippophaes (Esper, 1789)
Hyles livornica (Esper, 1780)
Hyles nicaea (de Prunner, 1798)
Hyles vespertilio (Esper, 1780)
Laothoe populi (Linnaeus, 1758)
Macroglossum stellatarum (Linnaeus, 1758)
Marumba quercus (Denis & Schiffermüller, 1775)
Mimas tiliae (Linnaeus, 1758)
Proserpinus proserpina (Pallas, 1772)
Rethera komarovi (Christoph, 1885)
Smerinthus ocellata (Linnaeus, 1758)
Sphingoneopsis gorgoniades (Hübner, 1819)
Sphinx ligustri Linnaeus, 1758
Sphinx pinastri Linnaeus, 1758
Theretra alecto (Linnaeus, 1758)

Stathmopodidae
Neomariania partinicensis (Rebel, 1937)
Tortilia graeca Kasy, 1981

Thyrididae
Thyris fenestrella (Scopoli, 1763)

Tineidae
Anomalotinea gardesanella (Hartig, 1950)
Anomalotinea liguriella (Milliere, 1879)
Archinemapogon yildizae Kocak, 1981
Ateliotum hungaricellum Zeller, 1839
Ateliotum petrinella (Herrich-Schäffer, 1854)
Ateliotum syriaca (Caradja, 1920)
Cephimallota angusticostella (Zeller, 1839)
Ceratuncus danubiella (Mann, 1866)
Crassicornella crassicornella (Zeller, 1847)
Dryadaula hellenica (Gaedike, 1988)
Edosa fuscoviolacella (Ragonot, 1895)
Eudarcia armatum (Gaedike, 1985)
Eudarcia glaseri (Petersen, 1967)
Eudarcia montanum (Gaedike, 1985)
Eudarcia sutteri Gaedike, 1997
Eudarcia verkerki Gaedike & Henderickx, 1999
Eudarcia hellenica Gaedike, 2007
Eudarcia lobata (Petersen & Gaedike, 1979)
Eudarcia confusella (Heydenreich, 1851)
Eudarcia fibigeri Gaedike, 1997
Eudarcia forsteri (Petersen, 1964)
Eudarcia graecum (Gaedike, 1985)
Eudarcia kasyi (Petersen, 1971)
Eudarcia moreae (Petersen & Gaedike, 1983)
Eudarcia holtzi (Rebel, 1902)
Euplocamus anthracinalis (Scopoli, 1763)
Euplocamus ophisus (Cramer, 1779)
Gaedikeia kokkariensis Sutter, 1998
Hapsifera luridella Zeller, 1847
Infurcitinea albicomella (Stainton, 1851)
Infurcitinea arenbergeri Gaedike, 1988
Infurcitinea finalis Gozmány, 1959
Infurcitinea graeca Gaedike, 1983
Infurcitinea hellenica Gaedike, 1997
Infurcitinea karsholti Gaedike, 1992
Infurcitinea lakoniae Gaedike, 1983
Infurcitinea litochorella Petersen, 1964
Infurcitinea nedae Gaedike, 1983
Infurcitinea nigropluviella (Walsingham, 1907)
Infurcitinea ochridella Petersen, 1962
Infurcitinea olympica Petersen, 1958
Infurcitinea parnassiella Gaedike, 1987
Infurcitinea reisseri Petersen, 1968
Infurcitinea rumelicella (Rebel, 1903)
Infurcitinea tauridella Petersen, 1968
Infurcitinea taurus Gaedike, 1988
Infurcitinea tribertii Gaedike, 1983
Lichenotinea pustulatella (Zeller, 1852)
Matratinea rufulicaput Sziraki & Szocs, 1990
Monopis crocicapitella (Clemens, 1859)
Monopis imella (Hübner, 1813)
Monopis laevigella (Denis & Schiffermüller, 1775)
Monopis obviella (Denis & Schiffermüller, 1775)
Monopis weaverella (Scott, 1858)
Morophaga choragella (Denis & Schiffermüller, 1775)
Morophaga morella (Duponchel, 1838)
Myrmecozela parnassiella (Rebel, 1915)
Myrmecozela stepicola Zagulajev, 1972
Nemapogon anatolica Gaedike, 1986
Nemapogon arenbergeri Gaedike, 1986
Nemapogon cloacella (Haworth, 1828)
Nemapogon falstriella (Bang-Haas, 1881)
Nemapogon granella (Linnaeus, 1758)
Nemapogon gravosaellus Petersen, 1957
Nemapogon hungaricus Gozmány, 1960
Nemapogon inconditella (Lucas, 1956)
Nemapogon orientalis Petersen, 1961
Nemapogon reisseri Petersen & Gaedike, 1983
Nemapogon ruricolella (Stainton, 1849)
Nemapogon scholzi Sutter, 2000
Nemapogon scutifera Gaedike, 2007
Nemapogon signatellus Petersen, 1957
Nemapogon variatella (Clemens, 1859)
Neurothaumasia ankerella (Mann, 1867)
Neurothaumasia macedonica Petersen, 1962
Niditinea fuscella (Linnaeus, 1758)
Niditinea striolella (Matsumura, 1931)
Novotinea klimeschi (Rebel, 1940)
Oinophila v-flava (Haworth, 1828)
Proterospastis merdella (Zeller, 1847)
Reisserita relicinella (Herrich-Schäffer, 1853)
Rhodobates unicolor (Staudinger, 1870)
Scardia boletella (Fabricius, 1794)
Stenoptinea cyaneimarmorella (Milliere, 1854)
Tenaga nigripunctella (Haworth, 1828)
Tenaga rhenania (Petersen, 1962)
Tinea basifasciella Ragonot, 1895
Tinea columbariella Wocke, 1877
Tinea flavescentella Haworth, 1828
Tinea messalina Robinson, 1979
Tinea murariella Staudinger, 1859
Tinea pellionella Linnaeus, 1758
Tinea translucens Meyrick, 1917
Tinea trinotella Thunberg, 1794
Triaxomasia caprimulgella (Stainton, 1851)
Triaxomera parasitella (Hübner, 1796)
Trichophaga bipartitella (Ragonot, 1892)
Trichophaga tapetzella (Linnaeus, 1758)

Tischeriidae
Coptotriche gaunacella (Duponchel, 1843)
Coptotriche marginea (Haworth, 1828)
Tischeria dodonaea Stainton, 1858
Tischeria ekebladella (Bjerkander, 1795)

Tortricidae
Acleris boscanoides Razowski, 1959
Acleris forsskaleana (Linnaeus, 1758)
Acleris hastiana (Linnaeus, 1758)
Acleris lipsiana (Denis & Schiffermüller, 1775)
Acleris quercinana (Zeller, 1849)
Acleris schalleriana (Linnaeus, 1761)
Acleris variegana (Denis & Schiffermüller, 1775)
Adoxophyes orana (Fischer v. Röslerstamm, 1834)
Aethes bilbaensis (Rossler, 1877)
Aethes flagellana (Duponchel, 1836)
Aethes francillana (Fabricius, 1794)
Aethes hartmanniana (Clerck, 1759)
Aethes margarotana (Duponchel, 1836)
Aethes mauritanica (Walsingham, 1898)
Aethes nefandana (Kennel, 1899)
Aethes sanguinana (Treitschke, 1830)
Aethes tesserana (Denis & Schiffermüller, 1775)
Aethes triangulana (Treitschke, 1835)
Aethes williana (Brahm, 1791)
Agapeta largana (Rebel, 1906)
Agapeta zoegana (Linnaeus, 1767)
Aleimma loeflingiana (Linnaeus, 1758)
Ancylis achatana (Denis & Schiffermüller, 1775)
Ancylis apicella (Denis & Schiffermüller, 1775)
Ancylis comptana (Frolich, 1828)
Ancylis selenana (Guenée, 1845)
Ancylis unguicella (Linnaeus, 1758)
Aphelia euxina (Djakonov, 1929)
Aphelia ferugana (Hübner, 1793)
Archips crataegana (Hübner, 1799)
Archips podana (Scopoli, 1763)
Archips rosana (Linnaeus, 1758)
Archips xylosteana (Linnaeus, 1758)
Argyrotaenia ljungiana (Thunberg, 1797)
Avaria hyerana (Milliere, 1858)
Bactra bactrana (Kennel, 1901)
Bactra furfurana (Haworth, 1811)
Bactra lancealana (Hübner, 1799)
Bactra venosana (Zeller, 1847)
Cacoecimorpha pronubana (Hübner, 1799)
Capua vulgana (Frolich, 1828)
Celypha lacunana (Denis & Schiffermüller, 1775)
Celypha rurestrana (Duponchel, 1843)
Celypha striana (Denis & Schiffermüller, 1775)
Celypha woodiana (Barrett, 1882)
Choristoneura hebenstreitella (Muller, 1764)
Choristoneura murinana (Hübner, 1799)
Clepsis consimilana (Hübner, 1817)
Clepsis pallidana (Fabricius, 1776)
Clepsis steineriana (Hübner, 1799)
Cnephasia asseclana (Denis & Schiffermüller, 1775)
Cnephasia communana (Herrich-Schäffer, 1851)
Cnephasia cupressivorana (Staudinger, 1871)
Cnephasia disforma Razowski, 1983
Cnephasia divisana Razowski, 1959
Cnephasia ecullyana Real, 1951
Cnephasia fragosana (Zeller, 1847)
Cnephasia graecana Rebel, 1902
Cnephasia gueneeana (Duponchel, 1836)
Cnephasia hellenica Obraztsov, 1956
Cnephasia heringi Razowski, 1958
Cnephasia longana (Haworth, 1811)
Cnephasia parnassicola Razowski, 1958
Cnephasia pasiuana (Hübner, 1799)
Cnephasia pumicana (Zeller, 1847)
Cnephasia stephensiana (Doubleday, 1849)
Cnephasia tofina Meyrick, 1922
Cnephasia abrasana (Duponchel, 1843)
Cnephasia incertana (Treitschke, 1835)
Cochylidia heydeniana (Herrich-Schäffer, 1851)
Cochylidia subroseana (Haworth, 1811)
Cochylimorpha meridiana (Staudinger, 1859)
Cochylimorpha straminea (Haworth, 1811)
Cochylis defessana (Mann, 1861)
Cochylis epilinana Duponchel, 1842
Cochylis molliculana Zeller, 1847
Cochylis nana (Haworth, 1811)
Cochylis pallidana Zeller, 1847
Cochylis posterana Zeller, 1847
Crocidosema plebejana Zeller, 1847
Cryptocochylis conjunctana (Mann, 1864)
Cydia alienana (Caradja, 1916)
Cydia amplana (Hübner, 1800)
Cydia blackmoreana (Walsingham, 1903)
Cydia conicolana (Heylaerts, 1874)
Cydia corollana (Hübner, 1823)
Cydia duplicana (Zetterstedt, 1839)
Cydia fagiglandana (Zeller, 1841)
Cydia honorana (Herrich-Schäffer, 1851)
Cydia ilipulana (Walsingham, 1903)
Cydia johanssoni Aarvik & Karsholt, 1993
Cydia plumbiferana (Staudinger, 1870)
Cydia pomonella (Linnaeus, 1758)
Cydia pyrivora (Danilevsky, 1947)
Cydia semicinctana (Kennel, 1901)
Cydia splendana (Hübner, 1799)
Cydia succedana (Denis & Schiffermüller, 1775)
Cydia trogodana Prose, 1988
Diceratura ostrinana (Guenée, 1845)
Diceratura rhodograpta Djakonov, 1929
Dichelia histrionana (Frolich, 1828)
Dichrorampha inconspicua (Danilevsky, 1948)
Dichrorampha incursana (Herrich-Schäffer, 1851)
Dichrorampha lasithicana Rebel, 1916
Dichrorampha montanana (Duponchel, 1843)
Dichrorampha petiverella (Linnaeus, 1758)
Dichrorampha plumbagana (Treitschke, 1830)
Dichrorampha plumbana (Scopoli, 1763)
Eana derivana (de La Harpe, 1858)
Eana italica (Obraztsov, 1950)
Eana penziana (Thunberg, 1791)
Eana argentana (Clerck, 1759)
Eana canescana (Guenée, 1845)
Endothenia gentianaeana (Hübner, 1799)
Endothenia oblongana (Haworth, 1811)
Endothenia sororiana (Herrich-Schäffer, 1850)
Epagoge grotiana (Fabricius, 1781)
Epiblema costipunctana (Haworth, 1811)
Epiblema cretana Osthelder, 1941
Epiblema foenella (Linnaeus, 1758)
Epiblema gammana (Mann, 1866)
Epiblema graphana (Treitschke, 1835)
Epiblema hepaticana (Treitschke, 1835)
Epiblema mendiculana (Treitschke, 1835)
Epiblema scutulana (Denis & Schiffermüller, 1775)
Epinotia brunnichana (Linnaeus, 1767)
Epinotia dalmatana (Rebel, 1891)
Epinotia festivana (Hübner, 1799)
Epinotia fraternana (Haworth, 1811)
Epinotia nigricana (Herrich-Schäffer, 1851)
Epinotia nigristriana Budashkin & Zlatkov, 2011
Epinotia nisella (Clerck, 1759)
Epinotia subsequana (Haworth, 1811)
Epinotia tedella (Clerck, 1759)
Epinotia thapsiana (Zeller, 1847)
Eucosma albidulana (Herrich-Schäffer, 1851)
Eucosma campoliliana (Denis & Schiffermüller, 1775)
Eucosma cana (Haworth, 1811)
Eucosma conformana (Mann, 1872)
Eucosma conterminana (Guenée, 1845)
Eucosma cumulana (Guenée, 1845)
Eucosma lugubrana (Treitschke, 1830)
Eucosma obumbratana (Lienig & Zeller, 1846)
Eudemis porphyrana (Hübner, 1799)
Eugnosta lathoniana (Hübner, 1800)
Eupoecilia cebrana (Hübner, 1813)
Falseuncaria ruficiliana (Haworth, 1811)
Grapholita funebrana Treitschke, 1835
Grapholita janthinana (Duponchel, 1843)
Grapholita molesta (Busck, 1916)
Grapholita compositella (Fabricius, 1775)
Grapholita coronillana Lienig & Zeller, 1846
Grapholita delineana Walker, 1863
Grapholita fissana (Frolich, 1828)
Grapholita gemmiferana Treitschke, 1835
Grapholita jungiella (Clerck, 1759)
Grapholita nebritana Treitschke, 1830
Grapholita orobana Treitschke, 1830
Gravitarmata margarotana (Heinemann, 1863)
Gynnidomorpha permixtana (Denis & Schiffermüller, 1775)
Gypsonoma aceriana (Duponchel, 1843)
Gypsonoma dealbana (Frolich, 1828)
Gypsonoma minutana (Hübner, 1799)
Gypsonoma sociana (Haworth, 1811)
Hedya nubiferana (Haworth, 1811)
Hedya pruniana (Hübner, 1799)
Hedya salicella (Linnaeus, 1758)
Hysterophora maculosana (Haworth, 1811)
Isotrias hybridana (Hübner, 1817)
Isotrias rectifasciana (Haworth, 1811)
Lathronympha christenseni Aarvik & Karsholt, 1993
Lathronympha strigana (Fabricius, 1775)
Lobesia artemisiana (Zeller, 1847)
Lobesia botrana (Denis & Schiffermüller, 1775)
Lobesia confinitana (Staudinger, 1870)
Neosphaleroptera nubilana (Hübner, 1799)
Notocelia cynosbatella (Linnaeus, 1758)
Notocelia incarnatana (Hübner, 1800)
Notocelia roborana (Denis & Schiffermüller, 1775)
Notocelia trimaculana (Haworth, 1811)
Notocelia uddmanniana (Linnaeus, 1758)
Olethreutes arcuella (Clerck, 1759)
Oxypteron eremica (Walsingham, 1907)
Pammene aurita Razowski, 1991
Pammene christophana (Moschler, 1862)
Pammene fasciana (Linnaeus, 1761)
Pammene gallicolana (Lienig & Zeller, 1846)
Pandemis cerasana (Hübner, 1786)
Pandemis heparana (Denis & Schiffermüller, 1775)
Paramesia gnomana (Clerck, 1759)
Pelochrista agrestana (Treitschke, 1830)
Pelochrista caecimaculana (Hübner, 1799)
Pelochrista duercki (Osthelder, 1941)
Pelochrista fusculana (Zeller, 1847)
Pelochrista medullana (Staudinger, 1879)
Phalonidia albipalpana (Zeller, 1847)
Phalonidia contractana (Zeller, 1847)
Phalonidia manniana (Fischer v. Röslerstamm, 1839)
Phiaris stibiana (Guenée, 1845)
Phtheochroa annae Huemer, 1990
Phtheochroa duponchelana (Duponchel, 1843)
Phtheochroa reisseri (Razowski, 1970)
Phtheochroa sodaliana (Haworth, 1811)
Prochlidonia amiantana (Hübner, 1799)
Propiromorpha rhodophana (Herrich-Schäffer, 1851)
Pseudargyrotoza conwagana (Fabricius, 1775)
Pseudococcyx tessulatana (Staudinger, 1871)
Ptycholoma lecheana (Linnaeus, 1758)
Ptycholomoides aeriferana (Herrich-Schäffer, 1851)
Rhyacionia buoliana (Denis & Schiffermüller, 1775)
Selania capparidana (Zeller, 1847)
Sparganothis pilleriana (Denis & Schiffermüller, 1775)
Spilonota ocellana (Denis & Schiffermüller, 1775)
Syndemis musculana (Hübner, 1799)
Thiodia major (Rebel, 1903)
Thiodia trochilana (Frolich, 1828)
Tortrix viridana Linnaeus, 1758
Xerocnephasia rigana (Sodoffsky, 1829)
Zeiraphera rufimitrana (Herrich-Schäffer, 1851)

Yponomeutidae
Cedestis gysseleniella Zeller, 1839
Cedestis subfasciella (Stephens, 1834)
Paradoxus osyridellus Stainton, 1869
Paraswammerdamia albicapitella (Scharfenberg, 1805)
Paraswammerdamia nebulella (Goeze, 1783)
Scythropia crataegella (Linnaeus, 1767)
Swammerdamia caesiella (Hübner, 1796)
Swammerdamia compunctella Herrich-Schäffer, 1855
Yponomeuta cagnagella (Hübner, 1813)
Yponomeuta evonymella (Linnaeus, 1758)
Yponomeuta malinellus Zeller, 1838
Yponomeuta padella (Linnaeus, 1758)
Yponomeuta plumbella (Denis & Schiffermüller, 1775)
Yponomeuta rorrella (Hübner, 1796)
Zelleria hepariella Stainton, 1849
Zelleria oleastrella (Milliere, 1864)

Ypsolophidae
Ochsenheimeria taurella (Denis & Schiffermüller, 1775)
Ypsolopha albiramella (Mann, 1861)
Ypsolopha dentella (Fabricius, 1775)
Ypsolopha instabilella (Mann, 1866)
Ypsolopha kristalleniae Rebel, 1916
Ypsolopha lucella (Fabricius, 1775)
Ypsolopha manniella (Staudinger, 1880)
Ypsolopha minotaurella (Rebel, 1916)
Ypsolopha parenthesella (Linnaeus, 1761)
Ypsolopha persicella (Fabricius, 1787)
Ypsolopha sculpturella (Herrich-Schäffer, 1854)
Ypsolopha sylvella (Linnaeus, 1767)
Ypsolopha trichonella (Mann, 1861)
Ypsolopha ustella (Clerck, 1759)

Zygaenidae
Adscita albanica (Naufock, 1926)
Adscita capitalis (Staudinger, 1879)
Adscita geryon (Hübner, 1813)
Adscita obscura (Zeller, 1847)
Adscita statices (Linnaeus, 1758)
Adscita mannii (Lederer, 1853)
Jordanita chloros (Hübner, 1813)
Jordanita globulariae (Hübner, 1793)
Jordanita graeca (Jordan, 1907)
Jordanita subsolana (Staudinger, 1862)
Jordanita budensis (Ad. & Au. Speyer, 1858)
Jordanita notata (Zeller, 1847)
Rhagades pruni (Denis & Schiffermüller, 1775)
Rhagades amasina (Herrich-Schäffer, 1851)
Theresimima ampellophaga (Bayle-Barelle, 1808)
Zygaena carniolica (Scopoli, 1763)
Zygaena sedi Fabricius, 1787
Zygaena brizae (Esper, 1800)
Zygaena laeta (Hübner, 1790)
Zygaena minos (Denis & Schiffermüller, 1775)
Zygaena punctum Ochsenheimer, 1808
Zygaena purpuralis (Brunnich, 1763)
Zygaena angelicae Ochsenheimer, 1808
Zygaena ephialtes (Linnaeus, 1767)
Zygaena filipendulae (Linnaeus, 1758)
Zygaena lonicerae (Scheven, 1777)
Zygaena loti (Denis & Schiffermüller, 1775)
Zygaena nevadensis Rambur, 1858
Zygaena viciae (Denis & Schiffermüller, 1775)

References

External links
Fauna Europaea

Greece
Greece
 Greece
Lepidoptera